= Ahmed Hamiani =

Algerian politician

3rd wali of Algiers Province
- In office December 6, 1962 – August 8, 1964
- Preceded by: Nadir Kassab
- Succeeded by: Rabah Bouaziz

Personal details
- Political party: FLN

Ahmed Hamiani was an Algerian politician and veteran of the Algerian War who served as the third wali of Algiers Province between 1962 and 1964.

== Biography ==
Hamiani became chief of staff of for Abdelkader Barakrok during Barakrok's time as Secretary of State of French Algeria between 1957 and 1962. Hamiani assisted Barakrok when the latter refused to attend the United Nations alongside the French delegation. Instead, Hamiani and Barakrok went to Geneva to meet with Liamine Zéroual and Khaled Nacer-Khodja, both intelligence officers in the Ministry of Armaments and General Liaisons, the predecessor to the modern Algerian security service.

After Algerian independence, Hamiani was appointed as the third wali of Algiers Province on December 6, 1962, replacing Nadir Kassab. He held this position until August 8, 1964, when Hamiani was replaced by Rabah Bouaziz.
