= Michel Aurillac =

French lawyer, politician and author

- Born: 11 July 1928; Marseille, Bouches-du-Rhône, France
- Died: 6 July 2017 (aged 88)
- Education: Sciences Po; École nationale d'administration
- Occupations: Lawyer, politician, author
- Political party: Rally for the Republic
- Spouse: Martine Aurillac

Michel Aurillac (11 July 1928 – 6 July 2017) was a French lawyer, politician and author. He served as a member of the National Assembly for Indre from 1978 to 1981, and in 1986. He was the Minister of Cooperation from 1986 to 1988. He won the 1987 Prix Narcisse Michaut from the Académie française.

== Early life ==
Michel Aurillac was born on 11 July 1928. He grew up in French Indochina, where his father was a governor.

Aurillac was educated at the Lycée Albert-Sarraut in Hanoi, the Lycée Chasseloup-Laubat in Saigon, and the Collège de la Providence in Hué. He graduated from Sciences Po and the École nationale d'administration.

== Career ==
Aurillac began his career at the Conseil d'État in 1953. He was an advisor to Abdelkader Barakrok, the Secretary of State for French Algeria, from 1957 to 1958. In 1959, Aurillac became Léopold Sédar Senghor's assistant, a year later, Senghor became the first president of Senegal, up until 1980. In 1963, Aurillac joined then-Prime Minister Georges Pompidou's cabinet as an advisor. He was subsequently Pierre Messmer's advisor and Michel Poniatowski's chief of staff. He was the Prefect of Indre in 1965, the Prefect of Essonne in 1969, and the Prefect of Picardy and Somme in 1973–1974.

Aurillac joined the Rally for the Republic, a centre-right political party. He served as a member of the National Assembly for Indre from 1978 to 1981, and in 1986. He served as the Minister of Cooperation and Development by then-Prime Minister Jacques Chirac from 1986 to 1988. He subsequently practised the law until 2001.

Aurillac was the author of several books. He won the Prix Narcisse Michaut from the Académie française for his 1987 book Le royaume oublié. He was an officer of the Legion of Honour and the National Order of Merit.

== Works ==
- Aurillac, Michel (1979). Réflexions sur la défense.
- Aurillac, Michel, ed. (1980). Le Péril bureaucratique. Paris: Club de l'Horloge. OCLC 16777976.
- Aurillac, Michel; Toubon, Jacques (1984). Libérer la communication. Paris: Albatros. OCLC 901842326.
- Aurillac, Michel, ed. (1985). Une stratégie de gouvernement. Paris: Albatros. ISBN 9782727301981. OCLC 715013477.
- Aurillac, Michel (1986). Le Royaume oublié. Paris: Olivier Orban. ISBN 9782855653211. OCLC 419861608.
- Aurillac, Michel (1987). L'Afrique à cœur : a coopération, un message d'avenir. Berger-Levrault. ISBN 9782701307398. OCLC 18382151.
- Aurillac, Michel, ed. (1988). Pour une société de progrès et de liberté. Paris: Albatros. ISBN 9782727301455. OCLC 263145465.
- Aurillac, Michel; Vermande, François (1993). Alarme, citoyens!. Paris: Plon. ISBN 9782259027540. OCLC 463724929.
- Aurillac, Michel (2006). L'Arbre de vie. Montreal: Hurtubise. ISBN 9782894288832. OCLC 155715459.

== Personal life and death ==
Aurillac was married to Martine Aurillac, who was also a politician. He died on 6 July 2017, at the age of 89.
