= Amar Mohammedi =

Algerian politician

1st wali of Algiers Province
- In office June 17, 1962 – July 6, 1962
- Preceded by: Vitalis Cros
- Succeeded by: Nadir Kassab

Wali of the Algiers Autonomous Zone
- Preceded by: Saadi Yacef
- Succeeded by: Position abolished

Personal details
- Political party: FLN

Amar Mohammedi was an Algerian veteran and politician who served as the first wali of Algiers Province following Algerian independence in 1962, and as the head of the Autonomous Zone of Algiers between 1957 and 1962.

== Biography ==
Little is known about Mohammedi's early life. His first political position was as head of the Autonomous Zone of Algiers after the arrest of ZAA leader Saadi Yacef after Yacef's arrest by French authorities on September 24, 1957. Following Algerian independence in 1962, Mohammedi's role as head of the ZAA was transferred to wali of Algiers Province, and he received the keys to the city from French head of Algiers Vitalis Cros. Christian Fouchet stated that Cros and Mohammedi worked together during the transfer of control of Algiers from France to Algeria.

Between 1961 and 1962, Mohammedi participated in Algeria's transition to independence under Commander Azzedine and kept the peace during the 1962 Algerian independence referendum. Nadir Kassab succeeded Mohammedi as wali of Algiers on July 6, 1962, just nineteen days after Mohammedi became wali.
