= Gallery of Montparnasse =

- Galerie du Montparnasse
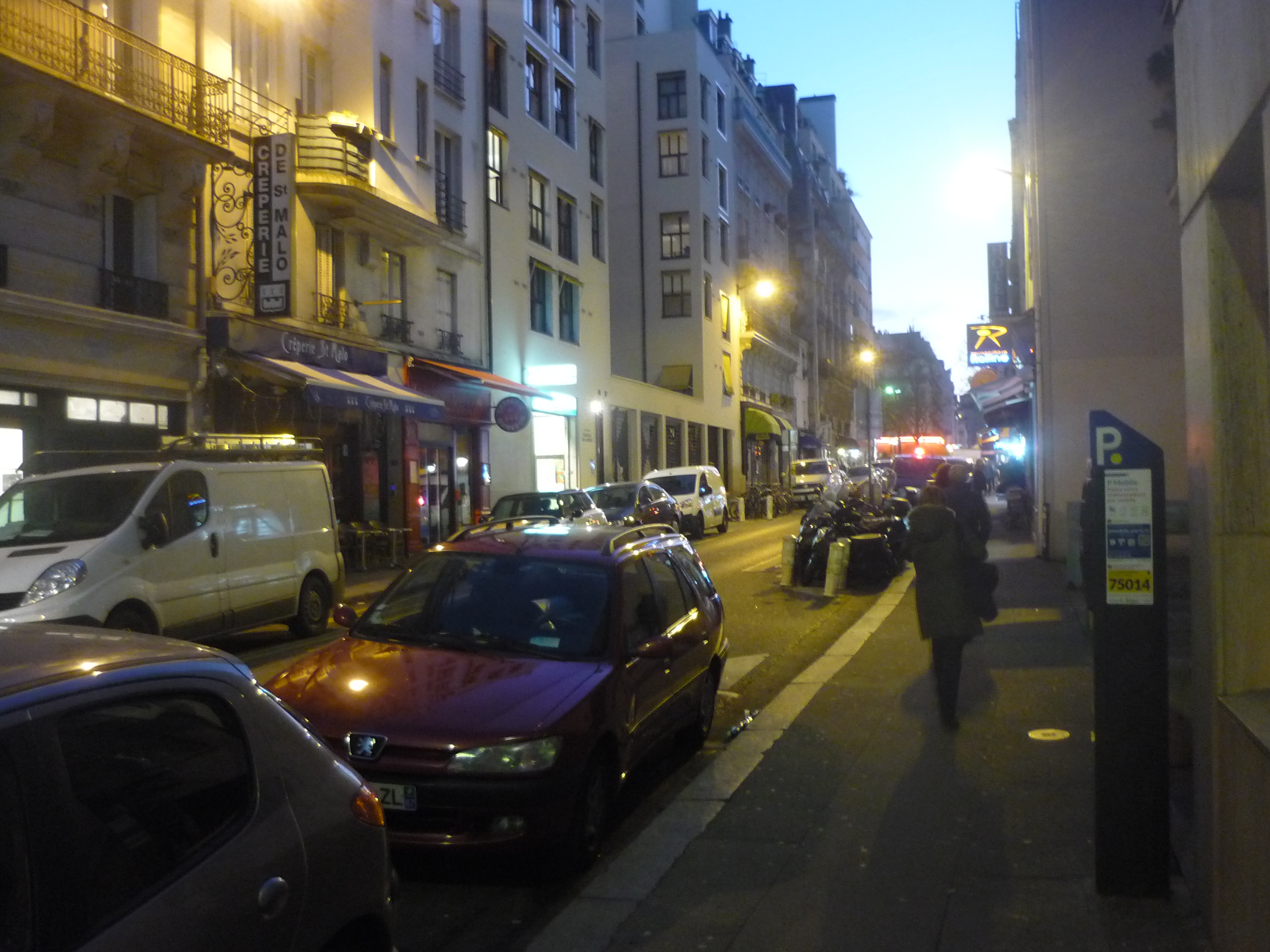
- The Rue du Montparnasse at night with the gallery illuminated in the centre.
- Location: Montparnasse, Paris (France)
- Type: Contemporary art gallery
- Owner: 14th arrondissement of Paris

The Gallery of Montparnasse (French: Galerie du Montparnasse) is a public contemporary art gallery in Paris, France. Located in the Montparnasse area, it is run by the city council of the 14th arrondissement of Paris. The gallery was the first to introduce abstract expressionism in France in the 1940s, exhibiting famous artists such as de Kooning, Picabia or Pollock.

== History ==
The Gallery of Montparnasse was an ancient bookshop transformed into a contemporary art gallery during the first half of the 20th century.

In November 1948, Georges Mathieu and Alfred Russell organized in the Gallery one of the firsts exhibitions of abstract expressionism in France. It featured several well-known American artists such as Willem de Kooning, Arshile Gorky, Ad Reinhardt, Hans Hartung, Georges Mathieu, Mark Tobey, Francis Picabia, Jackson Pollock and Mark Rothko. For most of them it was the first time their paintings were exhibited in France.

The gallery today belongs to the city council of Paris and the city council of the 14th arrondissement of Paris, and still hosts temporary exhibitions of paintings, sculptures and photographs.

== Famous artists exhibited in the gallery ==
- Joaquín Torres-García
- Alfred Russell
- Willem de Kooning
- Arshile Gorky
- Ad Reinhardt
- Hans Hartung
- Georges Mathieu
- Mark Tobey
- Francis Picabia
- Jackson Pollock
- Mark Rothko
