= Nadir Kassab =

Algerian politician (born 1927)

2nd wali of Algiers Province
- In office 6 July 1962 – 8 October 1962
- Preceded by: Amar Mohammedi
- Succeeded by: Ahmed Hamiani

Head of Special Organization in Kouba
- In office 1946–1962
- Preceded by: Position established
- Succeeded by: Position abolished

Personal details
- Born: 30 July 1927 Algiers, French Algeria
- Party: FLN

Nadir Kassab (born 30 July 1927) was an Algerian politician and veteran of the Algerian War who served as the second wali of Algiers Province.

== Biography ==
Kassab was born on 30 July 1927, in Algiers. He was first imprisoned during the Algerian War, and placed under house arrest by French authorities at his home in Kouba. While under house arrest, Kassab's home served as the meeting place between Algerian revolutionaries Mohamed Boudiaf and Krim Belkacem. Kassab later served as the head of the Special Organisation in Kouba during the war. Following Algerian independence, Kassab was named wali of Algiers Province following the resignation of Amar Mohammedi on 6 July 1962. Kassab served as wali until October 1962.
