= Saint-Dominique Church (Paris) =

Roman Catholic church in Paris, France

Coordinates: 48°49′56″N 2°20′06″E

Saint-Dominique Church, Paris
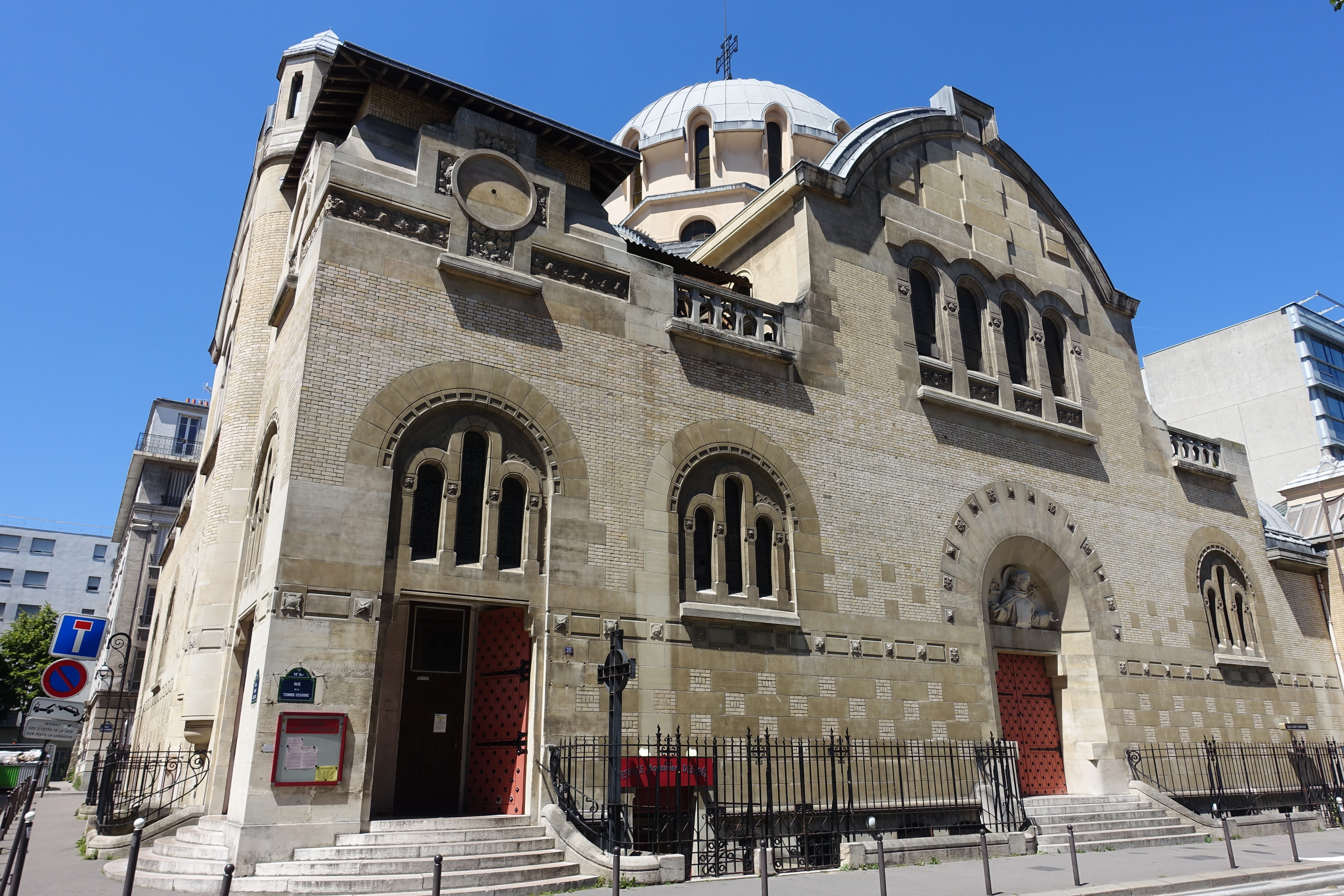
- Saint-Dominique Church, Paris

Religion
- Affiliation: Roman Catholic Church
- Diocese: Roman Catholic Archdiocese of Paris
- Region: Île-de-France
- Rite: Latin Rite
- Status: Active

Location
- Location: 14th arrondissement, Paris, France
- Interactive map of Saint-Dominique Church, Paris

Architecture
- Architect: Jules-Godefroy Astruc
- Groundbreaking: 1897
- Completed: 1902

Saint-Dominique Church is a Roman Catholic church located at 20 rue de la Tomb-Issoire in the 14th arrondissement of Paris. It was constructed between 1913 and 1921 in the Romano-Byzantine architectural style, mixed with Art Deco, popular in the period. The interior is lavishly decorated with paintings, sculpture and ceramics in the style of the period.

== History ==
The faubourg Saint-Jacques neighbourhood of the 14th arrondissement had become a religious center in the 17th century, with the Abbey of Port Royal and the Convent of the Oratariens, and a scientific center with the opening of the Paris Observatory. In the 19th century, the construction of the boulevard de Port-Royal, brought a new surge in population and the need for a large church. In 1913 the architect [Georges Gaudibert was commissioned to build a new church. His plan combined Romaneaque and Byzantine elements, an atyle very popular during the period. The work was delayed by the First World War, and did not open until 1921.

While the plan was traditional, the building was not; it was one of the first churches in Paris built with reinforced concrete, giving the architect greater freedom. The interior was coverere with endue, rather than false stones. The ornamentation of the church inside and out was strongly influenced by the Art Deco movement of the time.

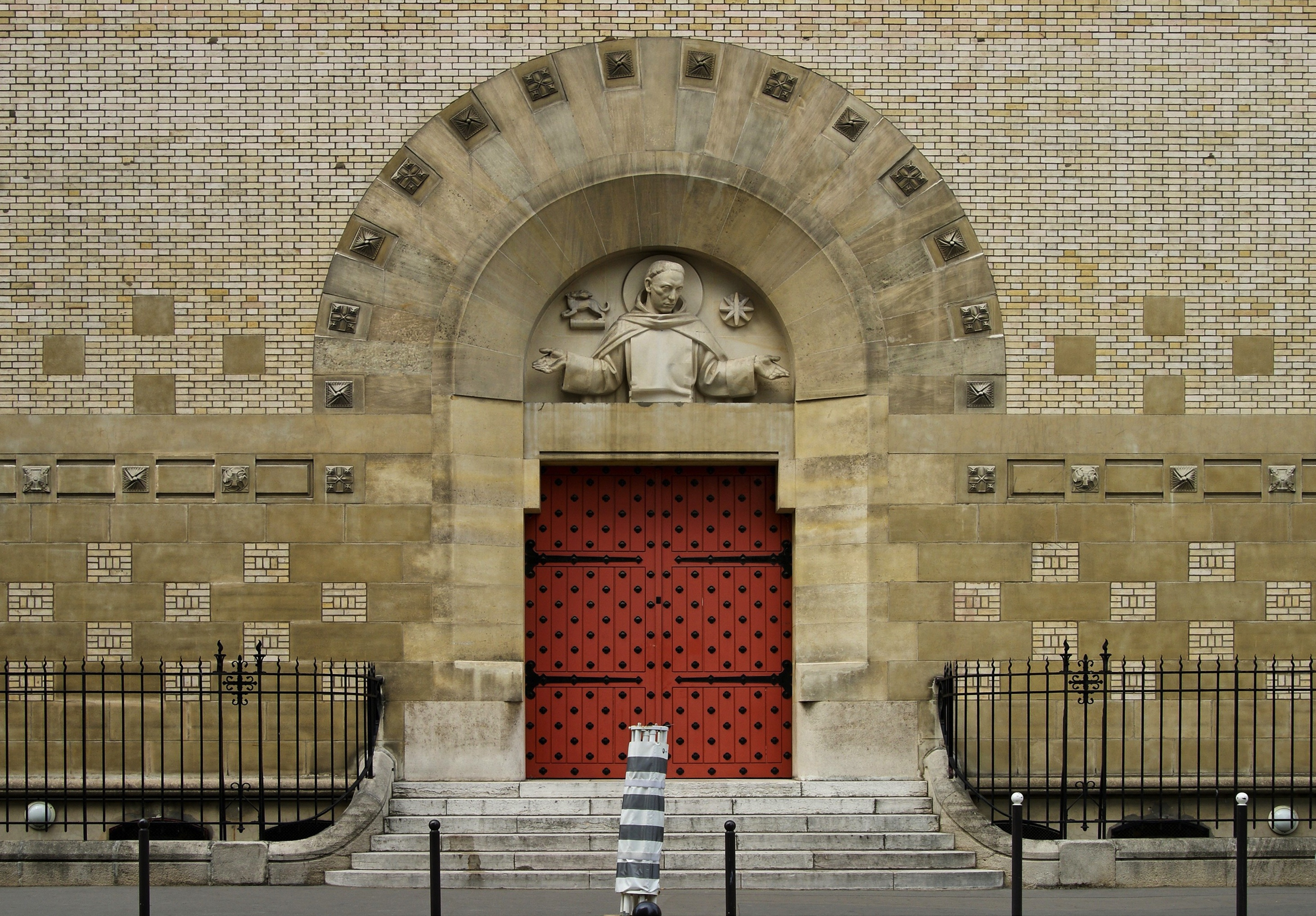
Portal of the church with sculpture of Saint Dominique

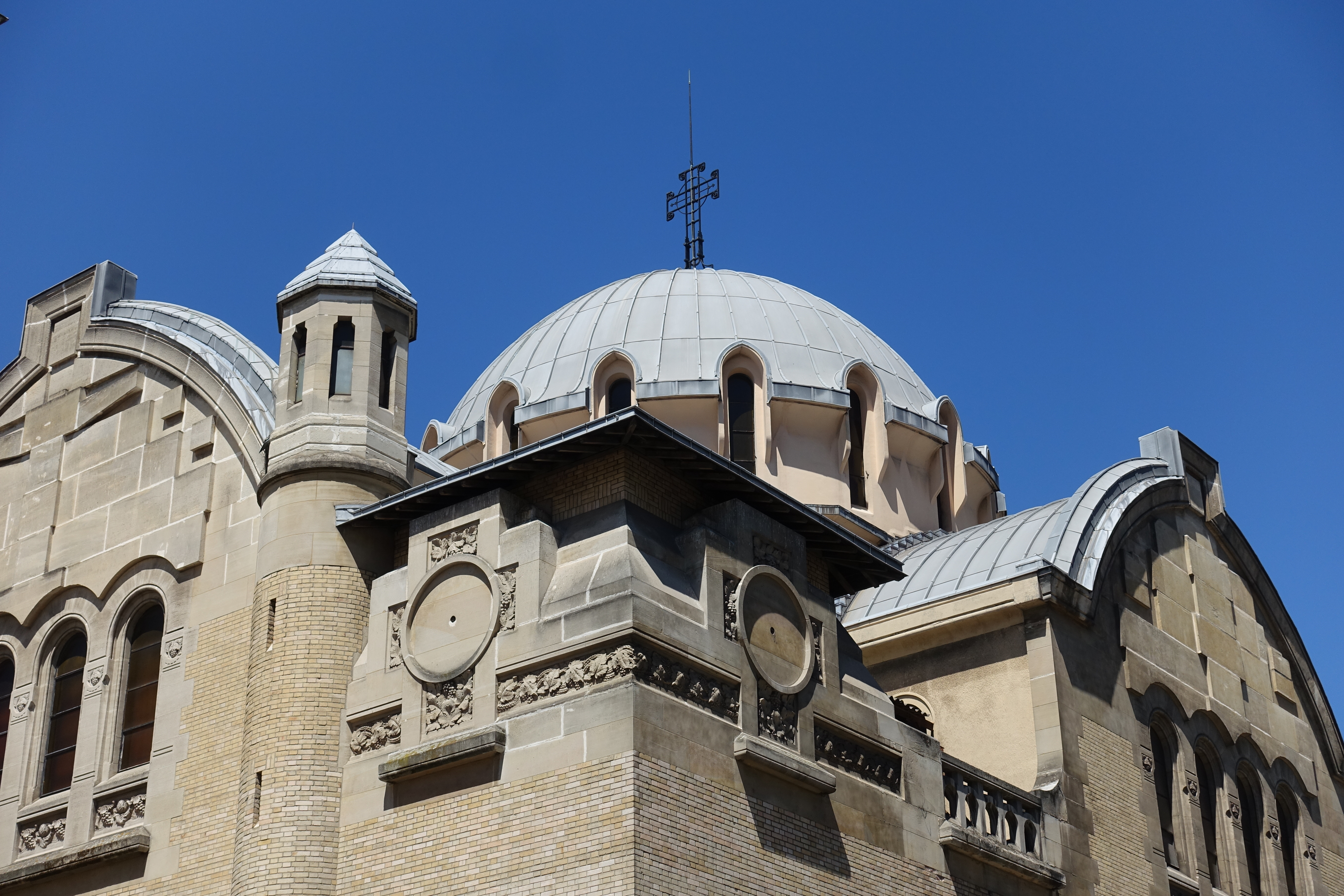
The dome

== Interior ==
The church was one of the first in Paris constructed with reinforced concrete, which gave the architect greater freedom to create spaces. The walls were covered with smooth coating, rather than false stones

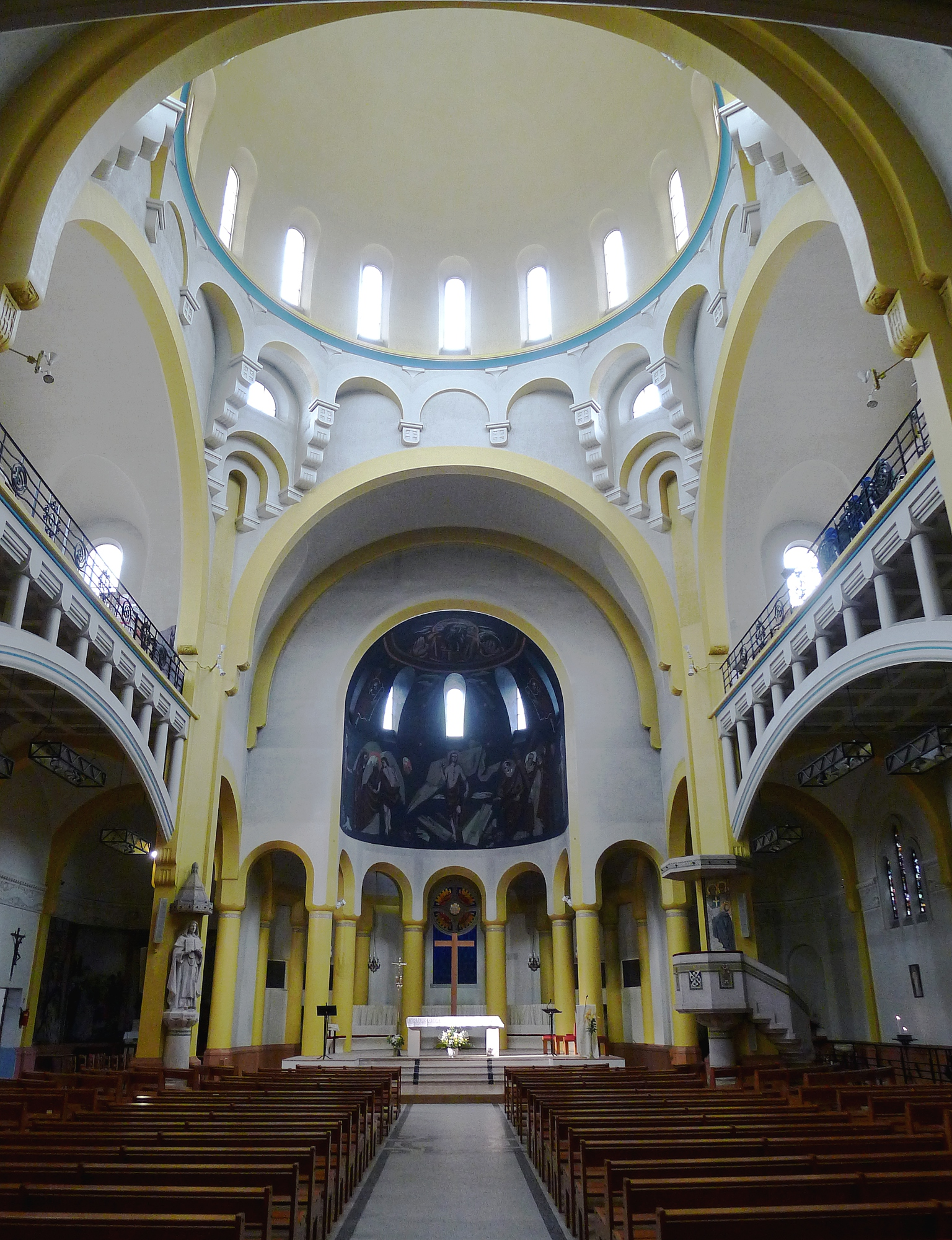
The dome and the nave

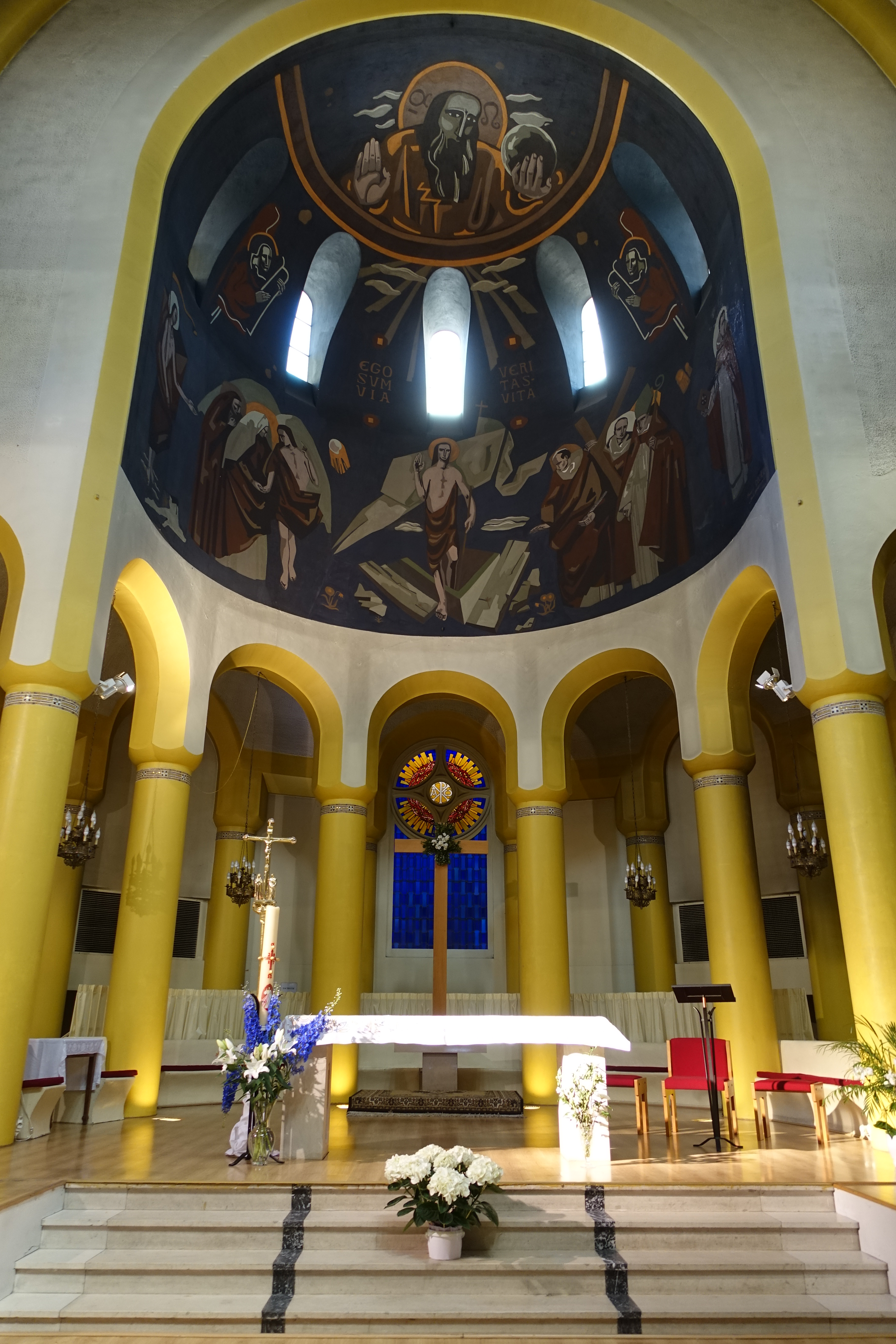
The choir and altar

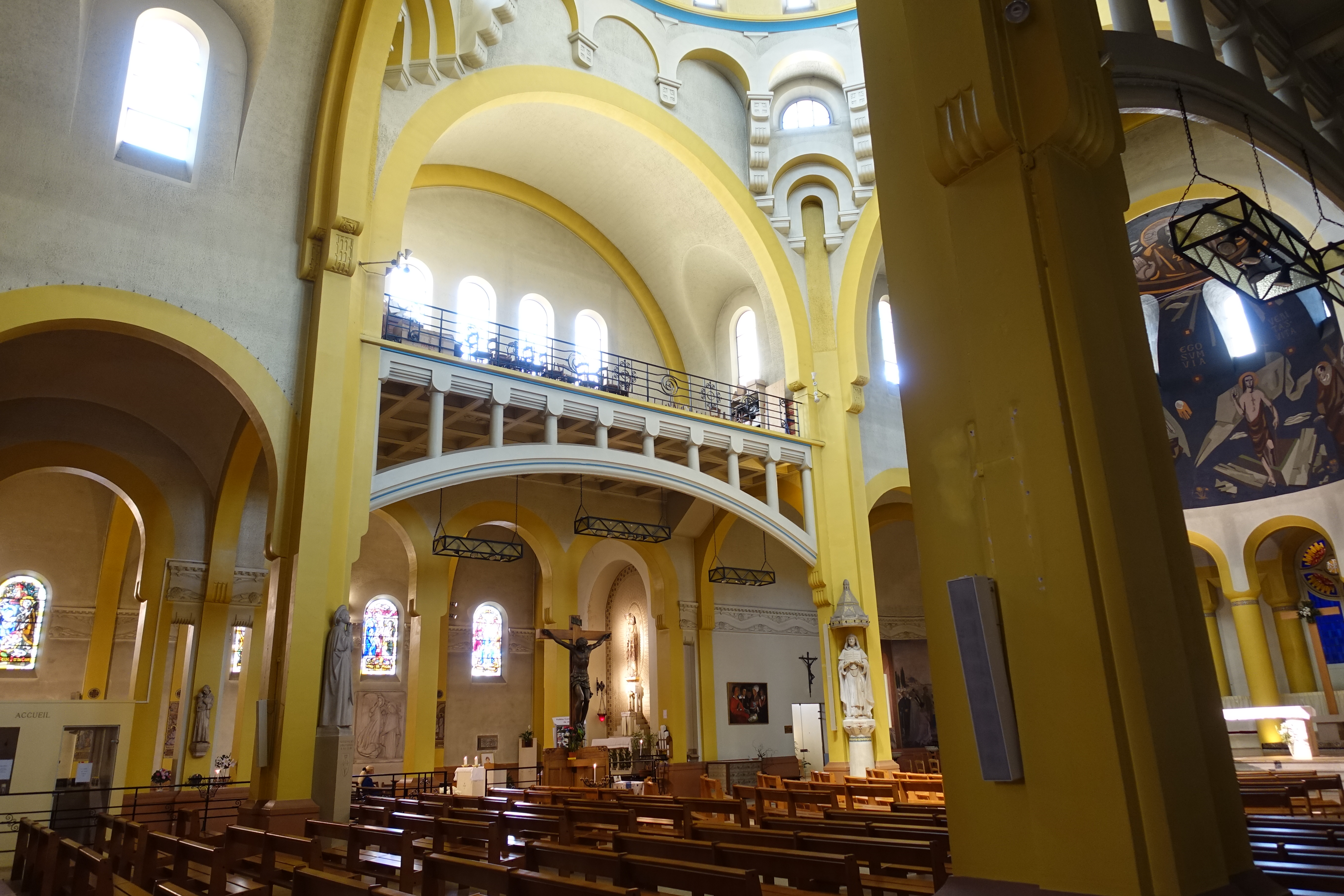
The side aisle

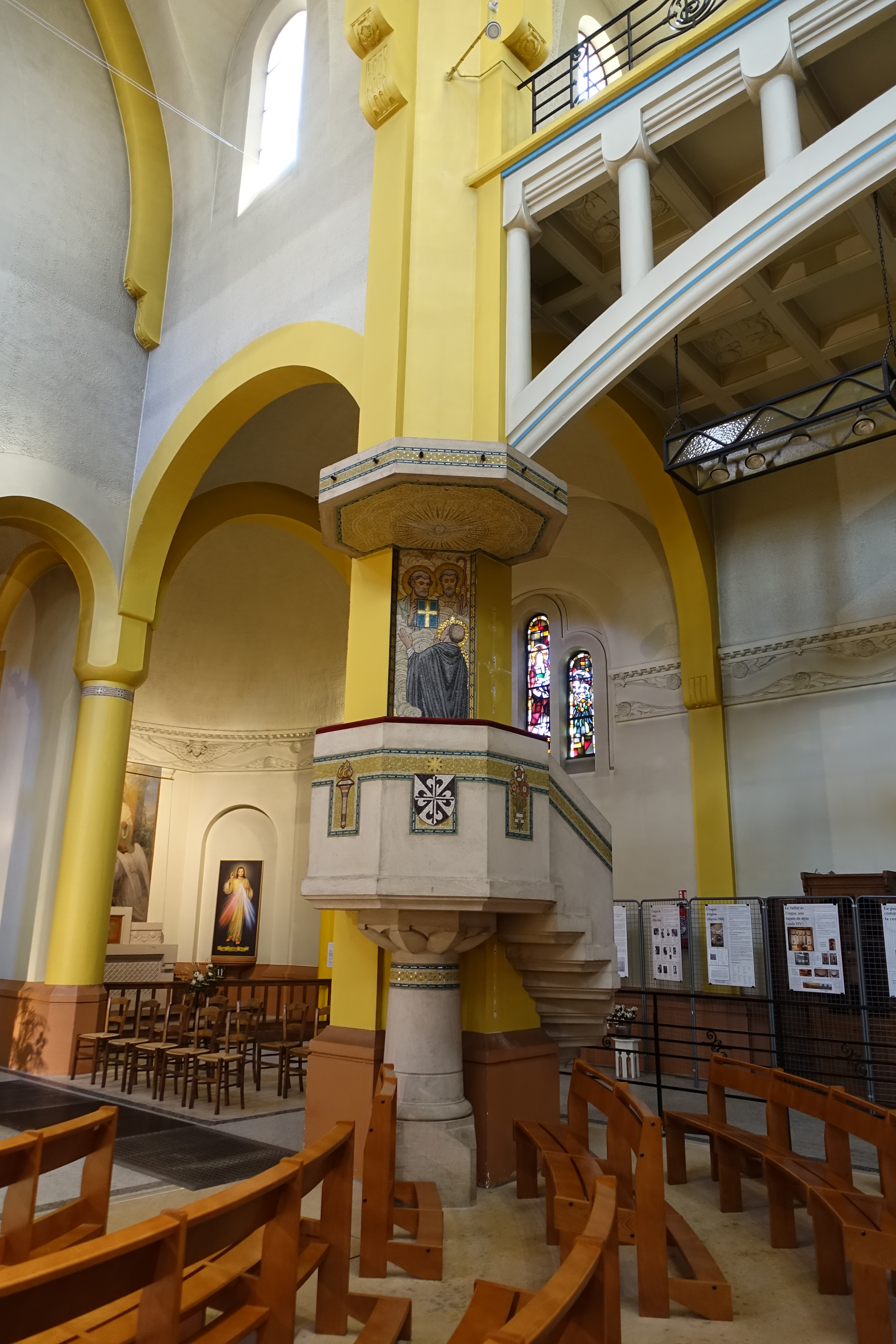
The pulpit, made of concrete and decorated with mosaics

== Art and decoration ==
The church is richly decorated with stained glass, sculpture, and mosaics. The stained glass was made by the master glassmakers Barillet and Checalier, completed in 1940. The mosaics on the pulpit were made by the brothers Maumejean.

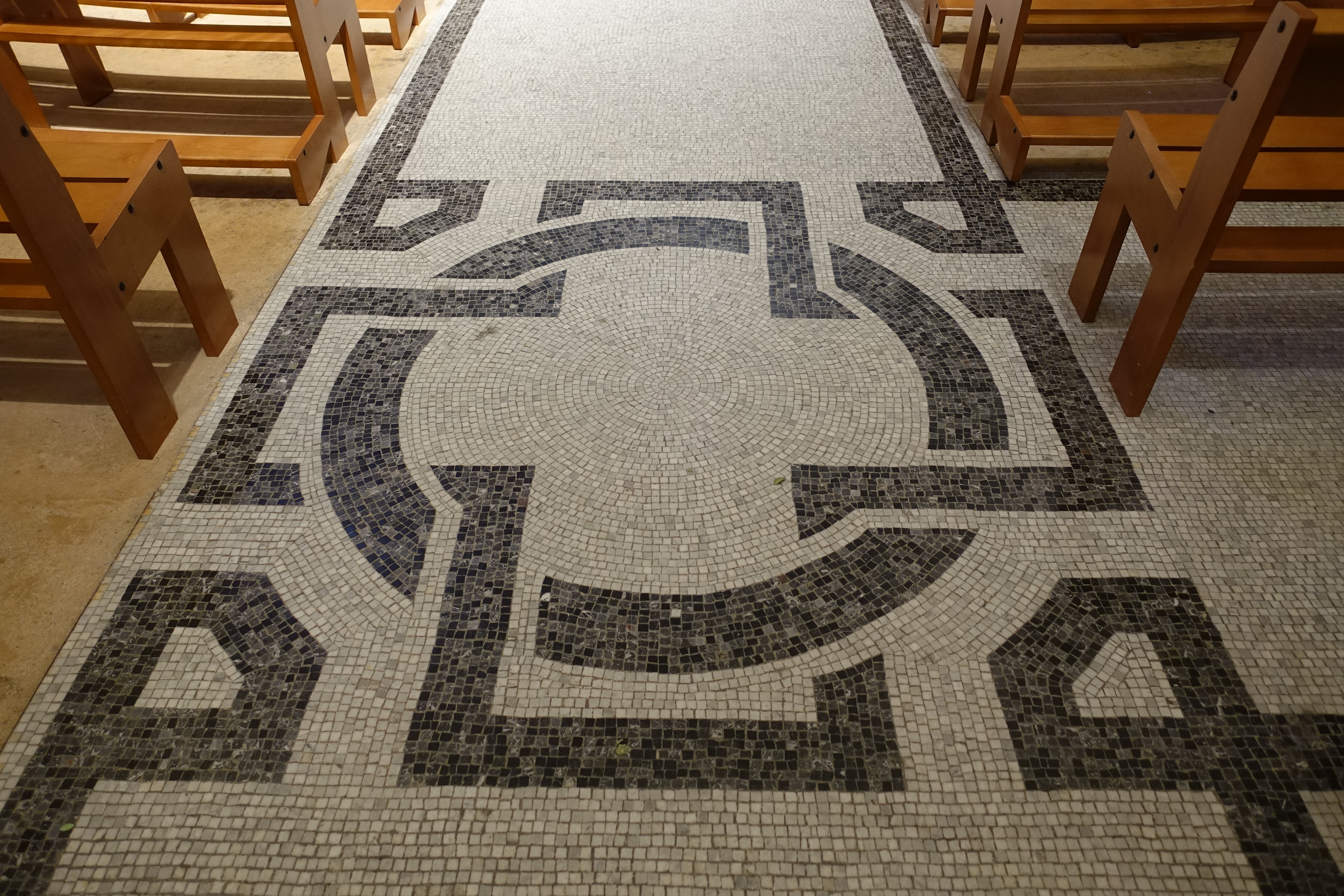
Ceramic floor in Nave

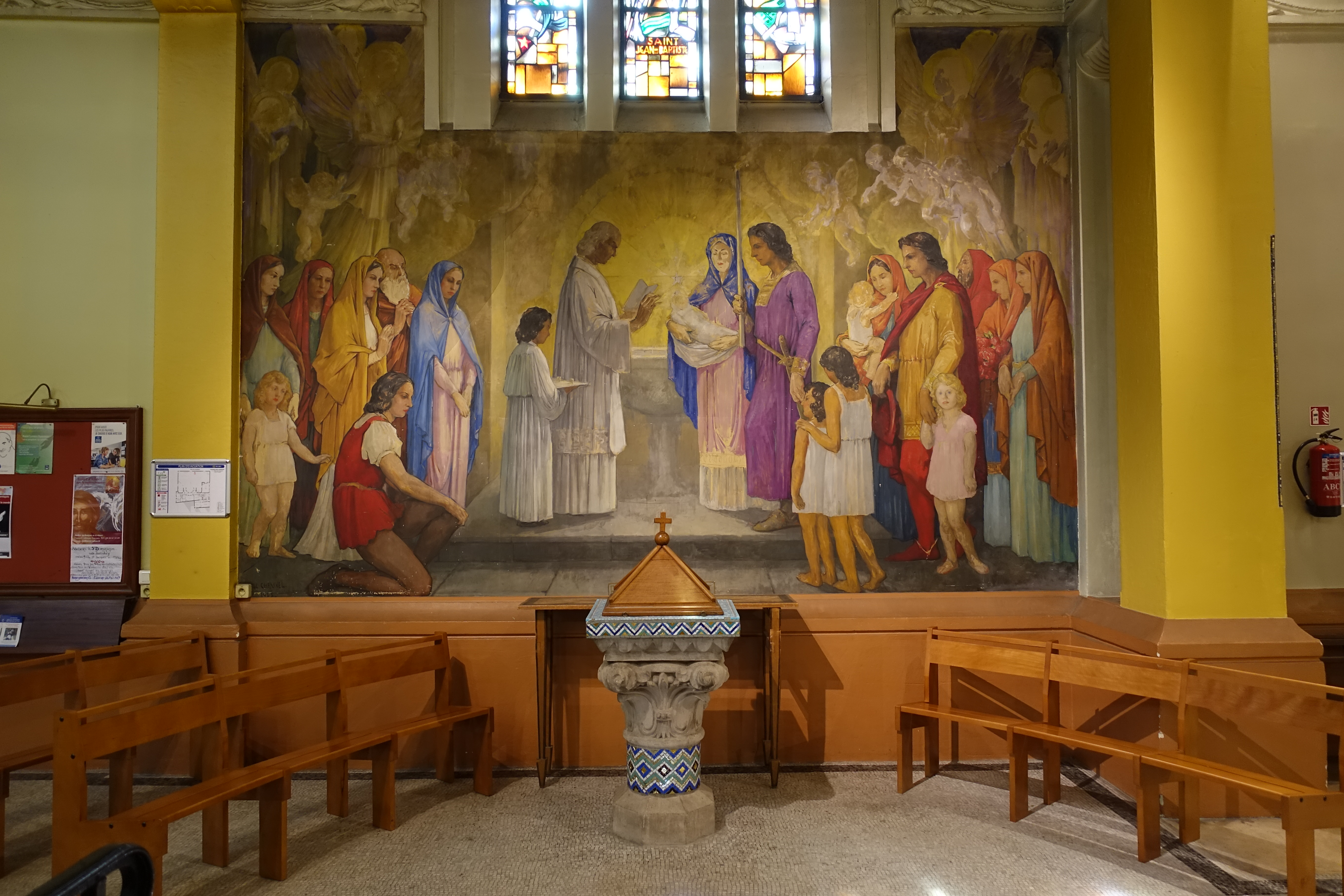
The Baptismal chapel with baptismal font

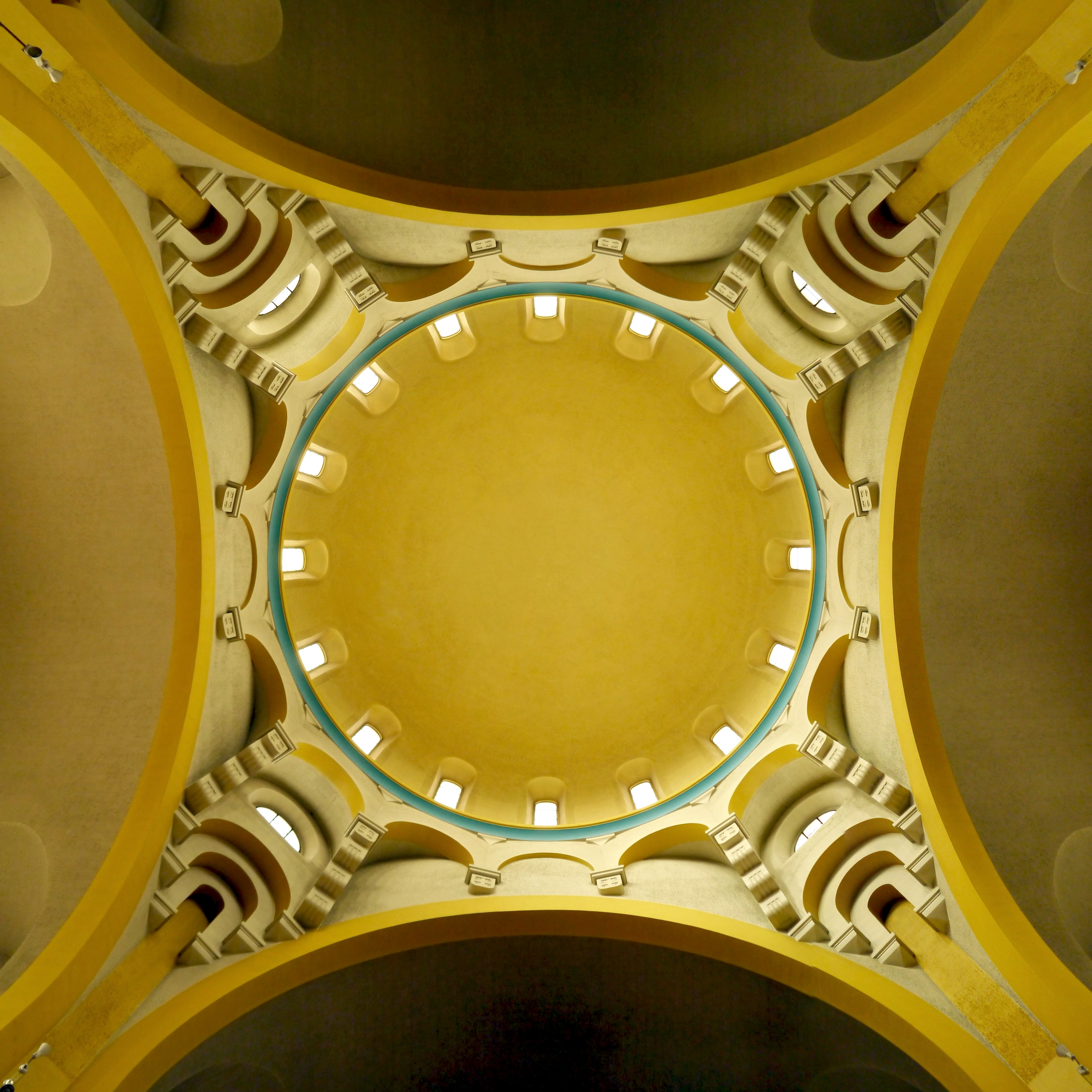
Central dome mosaic

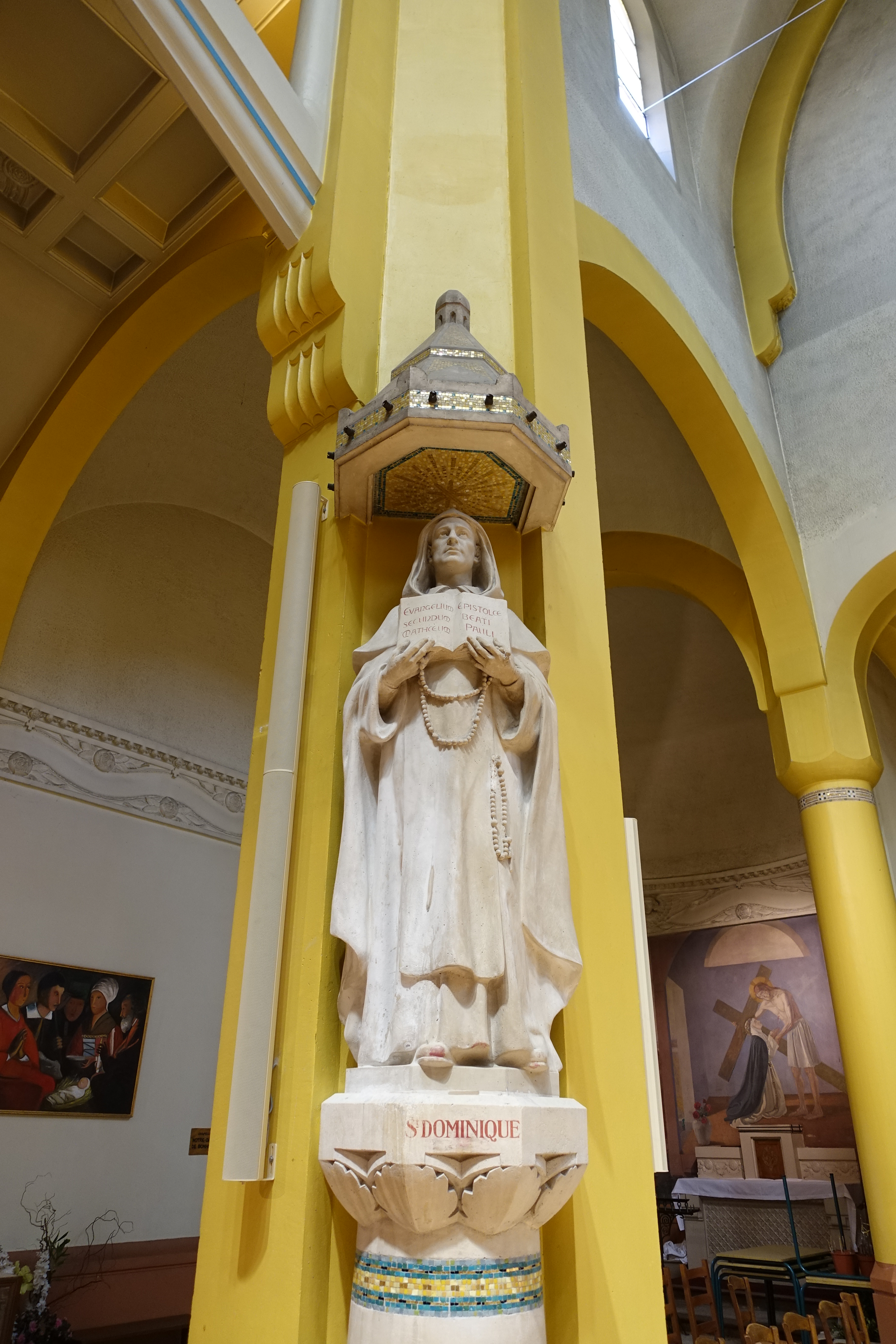
Statue of St. Dominique carrying her book and rosary, by C. Debert,

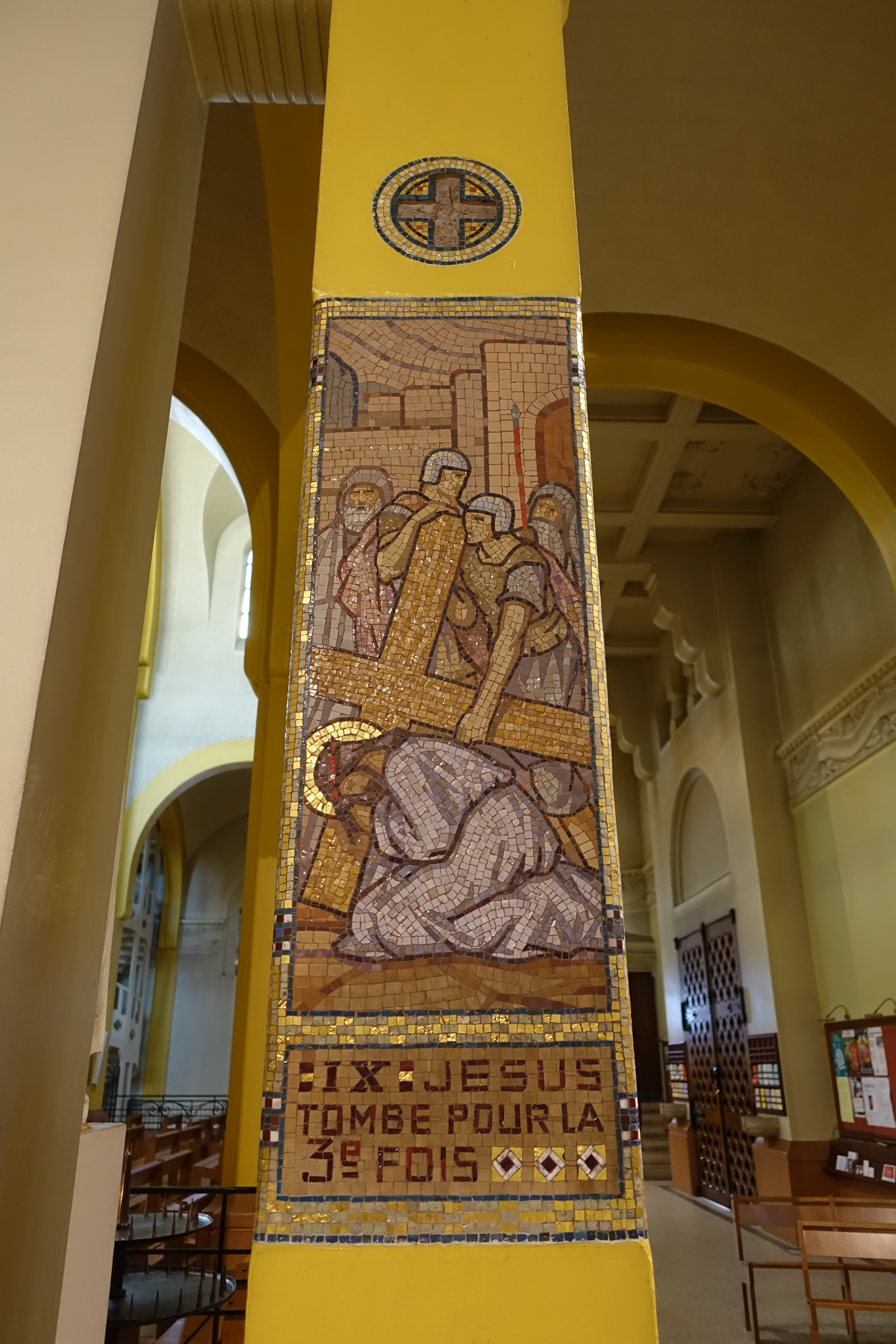
Station of the Cross ceramic by Maumejean (Station 5)

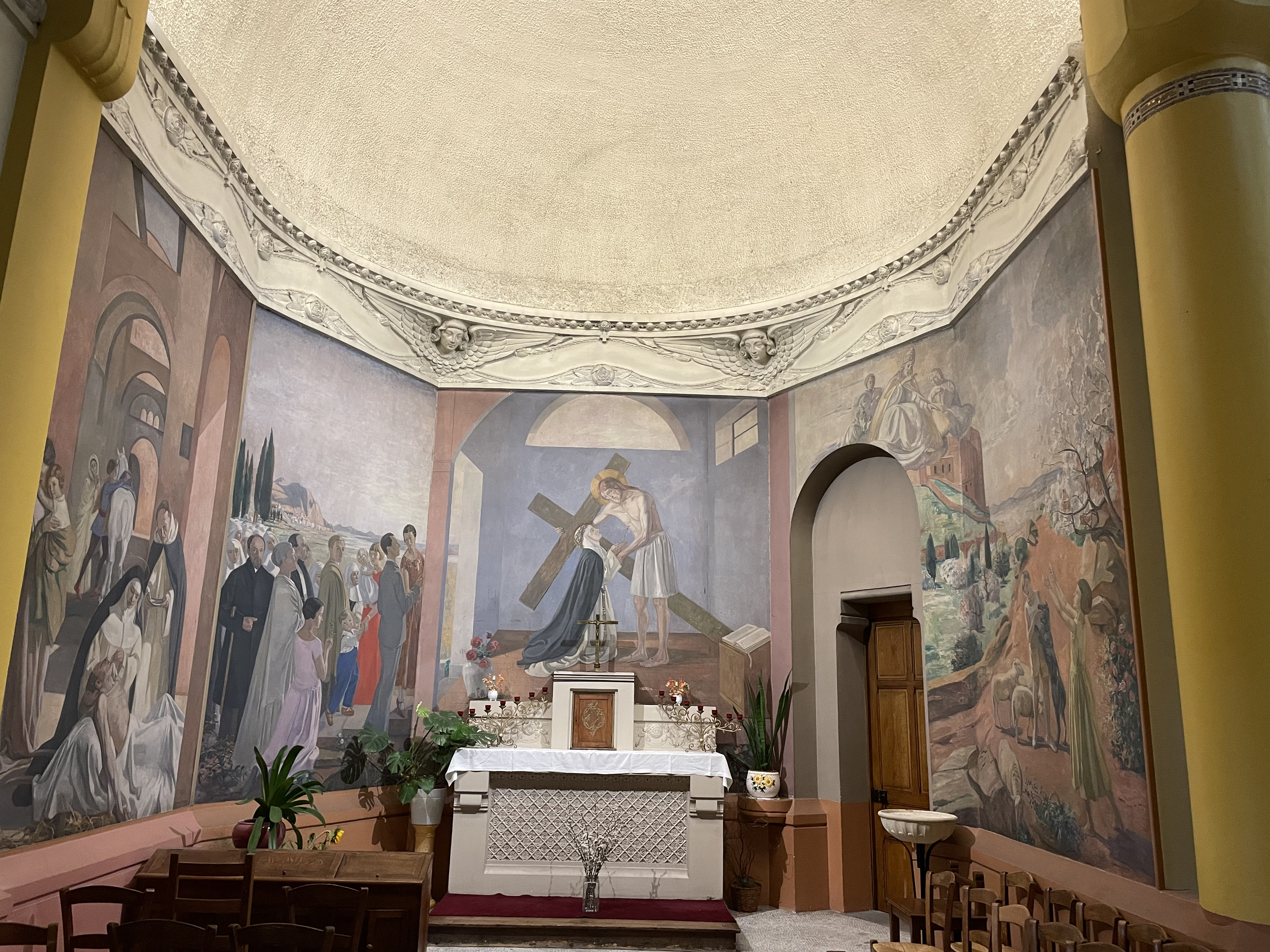
four murals on the life of Saint Catherine in her chapel

== Organ ==
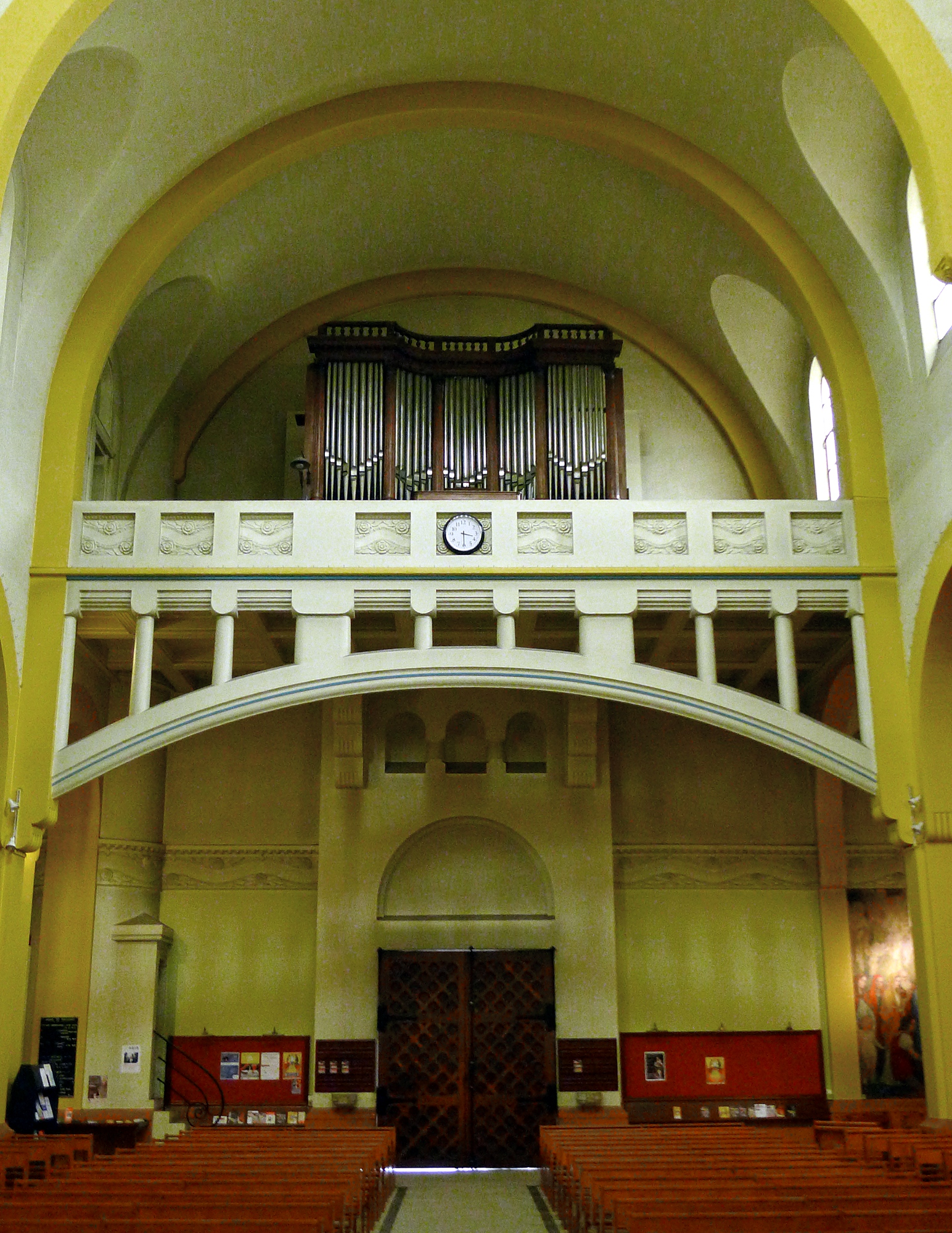
The organ over the porta;

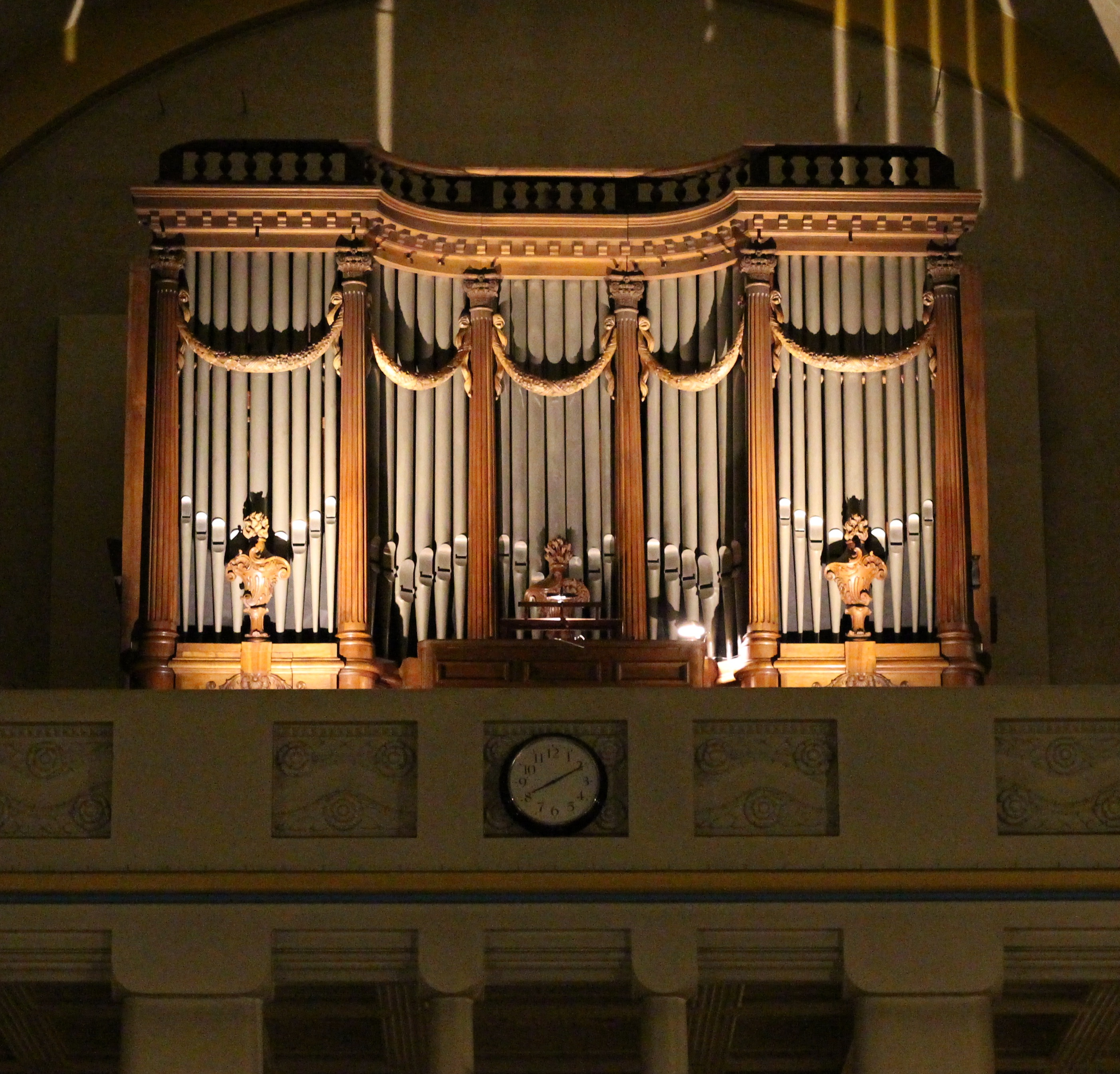
The buffet of the main organ

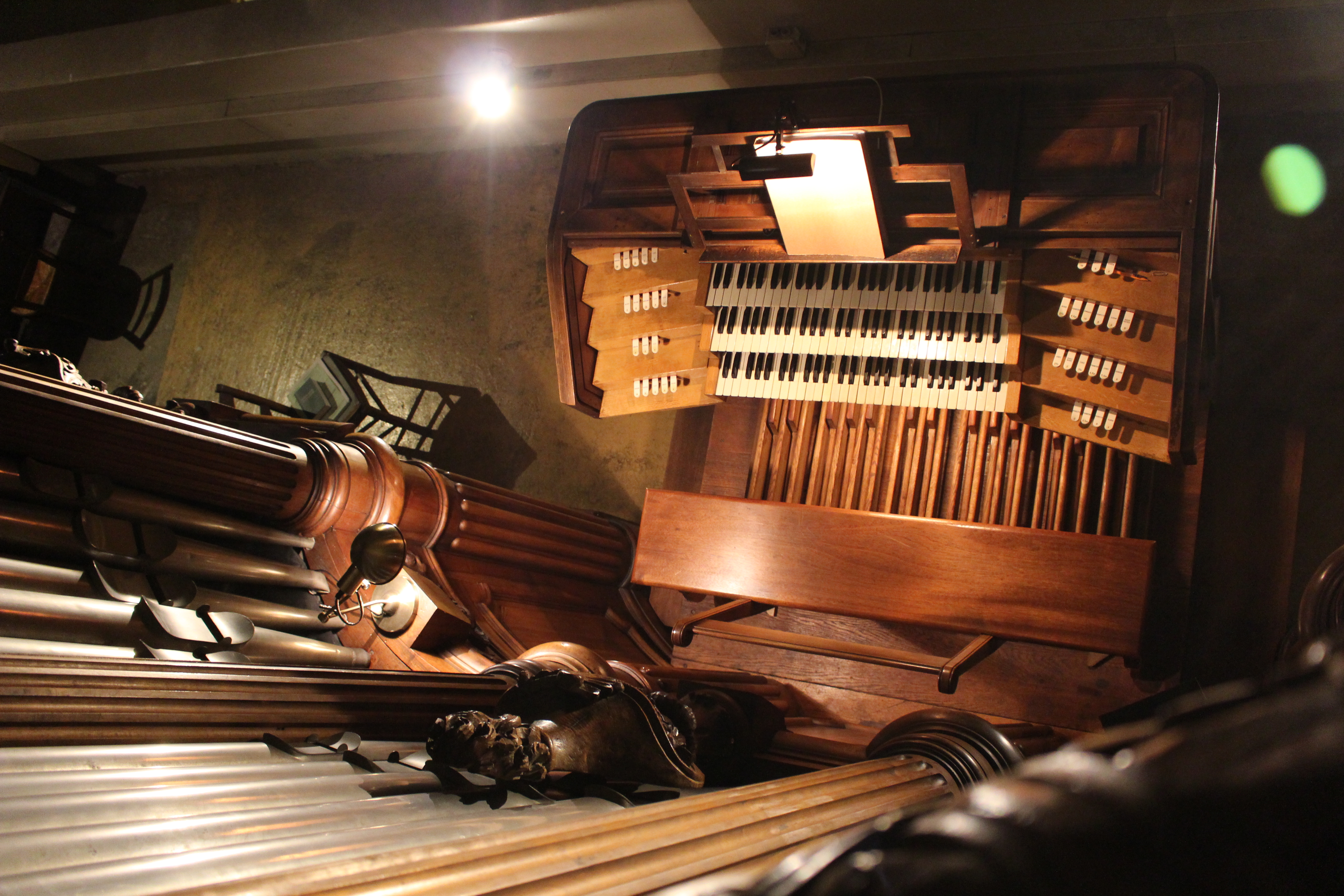
The console of the organ

The organ of Saint-Dominique is actually older than the church. It was originally built in 1904, and was the property of the composer Count Christian de Berthier dw Aauvigny. It was made for his residence by the firm of J. Merklin and Cie. It was transferred to the church in 1945. It was restored in 2003.
