= Notre-Dame du Rosaire, Paris =

Roman Catholic church in Paris, France

Coordinates: 48°49′45″N 2°18′29″E

Notre-Dame-du-Rosaire
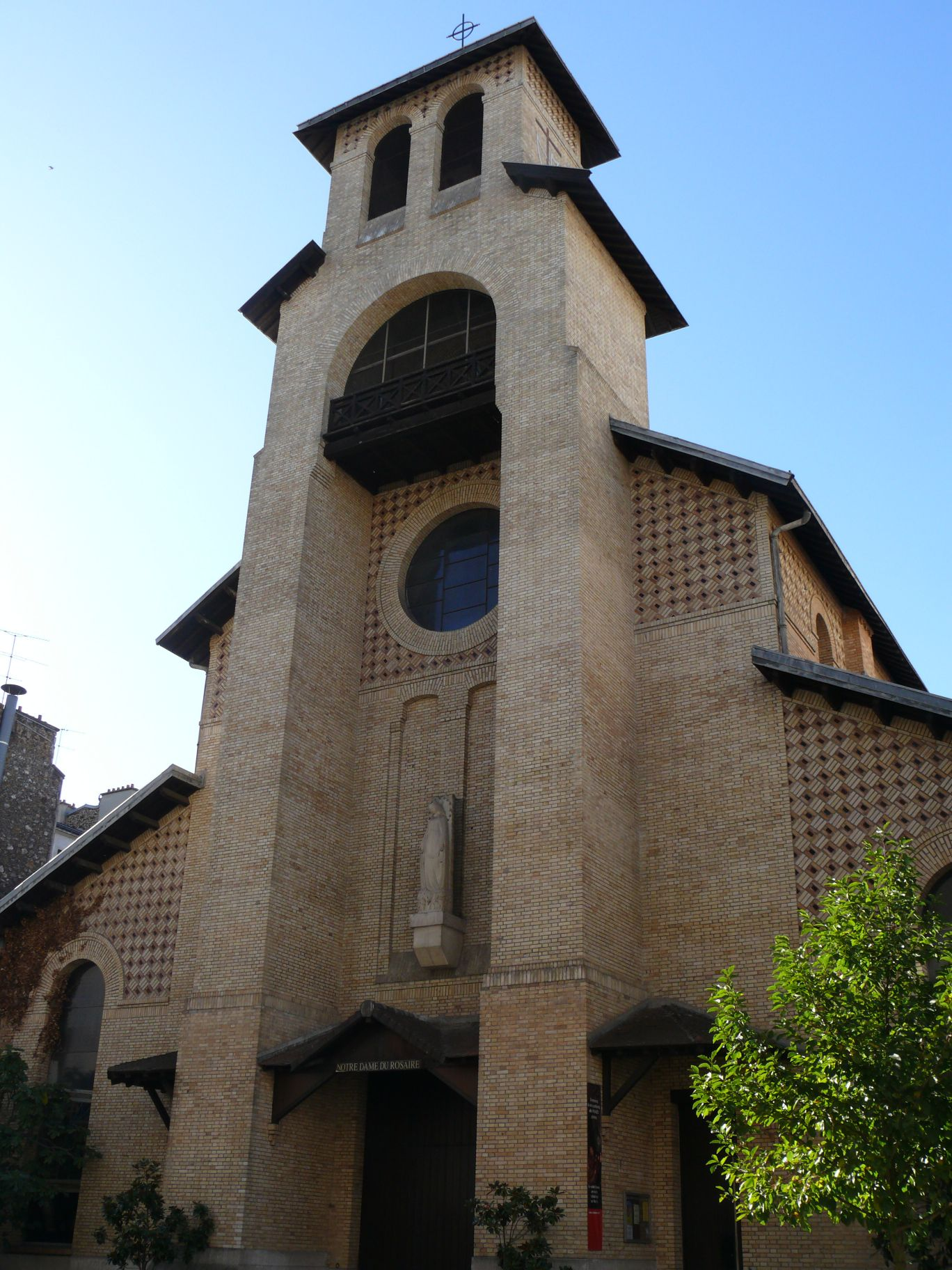
- Notre-Dame-du-Rosaire

Religion
- Affiliation: Catholic Church
- Province: Archdiocese of Paris
- Rite: Roman Rite

Location
- Location: 194 Rue Raimond-Losserand, 14th arrondissement of Paris
- Interactive map of Notre-Dame-du-Rosaire

Architecture
- Style: Neo-Roman, Neo-Byzantine
- Groundbreaking: 1910
- Completed: 1911

Notre-Dame-du-Rosaire is a Roman Catholic church located at 194 Rue Raimond-Losserand in the Plaisance Quarter of the 14th arrondissement of Paris, France. It was built between 1910 and 1912 by architect Pierre Sardou in a combination of the styles of neo-classical architecture and neo-Byzantine architecture, a blend very popular in that period. In 1919 the architect received the Bally Prize from the Academy of Fine Arts for his design of the church.

== History ==
The church was constructed in response to the large implantation of factories and the increase in population in the neighbourhood at the end of the 19th century.

The church was built following the plan of Pierre Sardou between 1909 and 1911. It was one of the first churches constructed under the formal separation of church and state, decreed in 1905. It was in striking contrast to the lavish Basilica of Sacre-Coeur, built at about the same time. The plan followed the new doctrines of simplicity; the doctrine required more and plainer chapels, and architecture which could be constructed more rapidly. Sardou was particularly influenced by the Church of the Holy Apostles in Florence, with its simplicity of forms, rounded arches, and plain capitals. The church was consecrated on 29 June 1911 by Bishop Leon Adolphe Amette.

The plan of the church was modified in 1967 in response to the decree of the Vatican Council II which moved the celebration of the mass closer to the people in the nave. The brick of the church, inside and out, received a major cleaning, which greatly brightened the interior.

== Exterior ==
The facade of the church features with very high arch containing a small rose window and topped by the Belfry. The decoration is primarily in the geometric designs of brick work. An extensive cleaning of the exterior changed the color of the church from gray to beige. The central decoration of the facade is the statue of the Virgin and child over the portal. The statue was made by Michael Serraz, and was inaugurated in 1958.

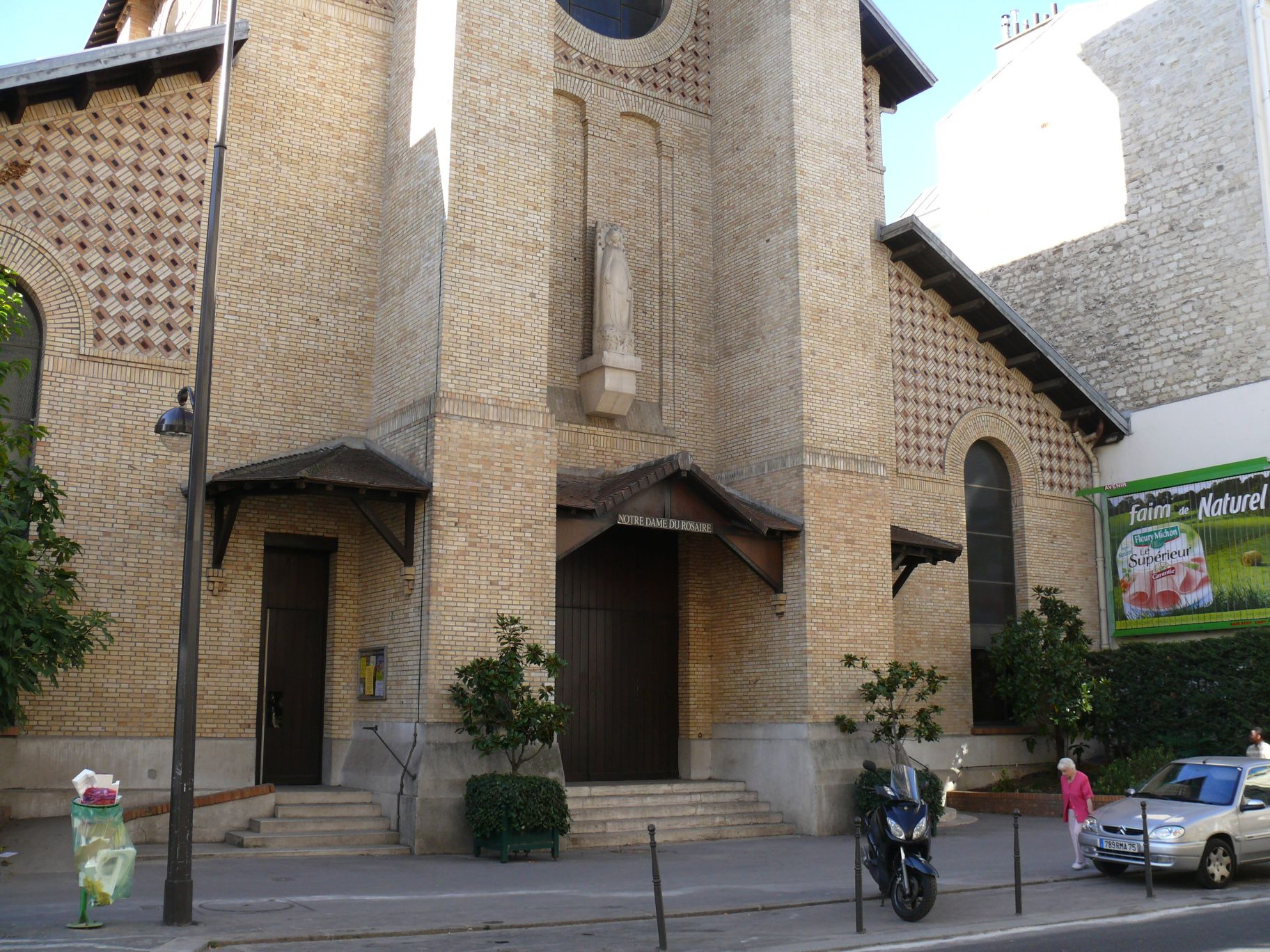
Church entrance, Henri-Marcel Magne (1877–1944), below statue of the Virgin

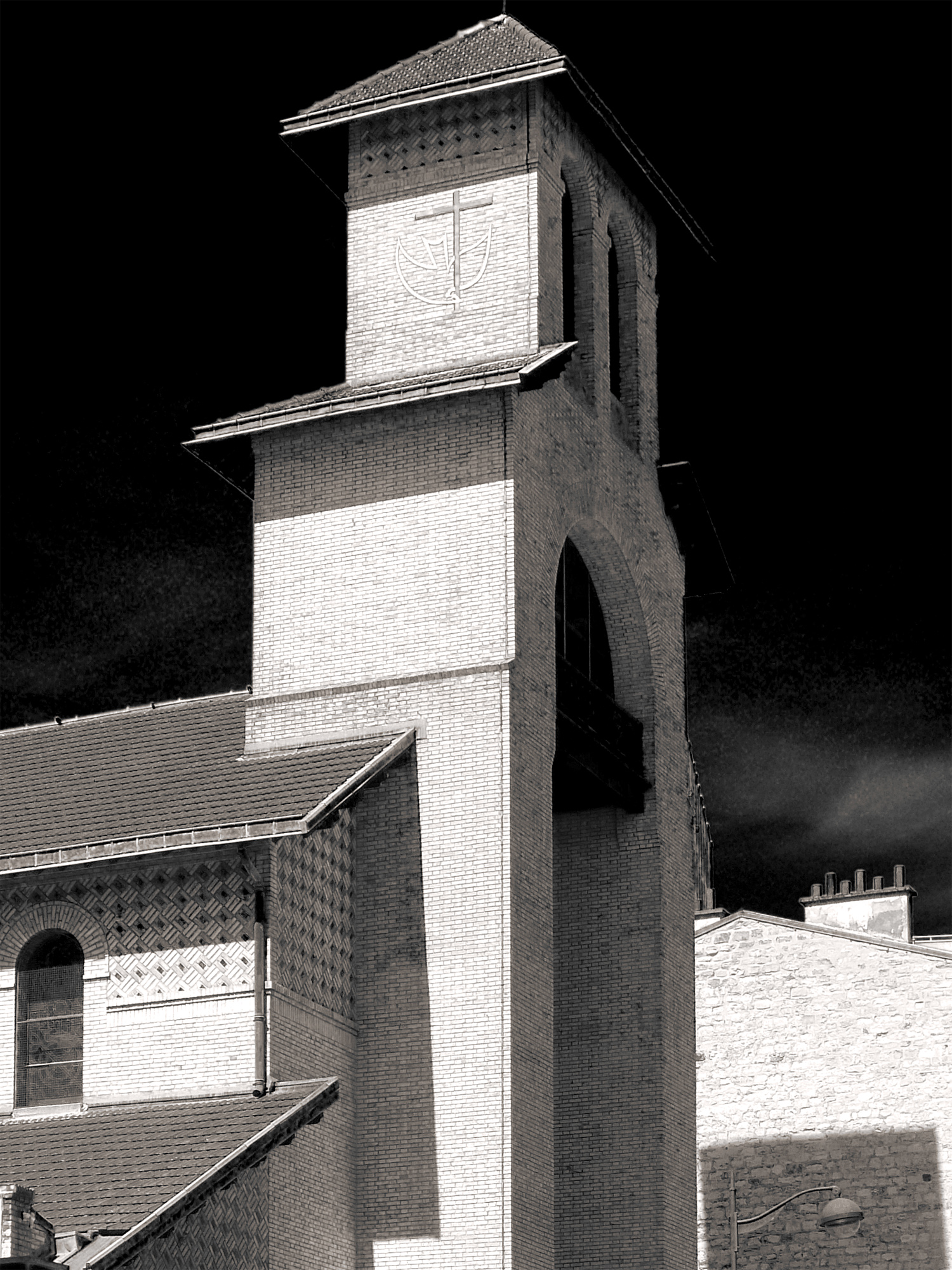
The bell tower

== Interior ==
The interior followed the same classical simplicity as the exterior. The arches of the arcades were rounded and the capitals of the columns were undecorated. he vaulted ceiling was made of wood with the structure fully exposed. The church was illuminated by a large number of Henristained glass windows designed by Henri-Marcel Magne (1877–1944).To offer a variety of services to the large community of parishioners, the church had a large variety of chapels. Like most churches of the period, the interior tended to very dimly lit.

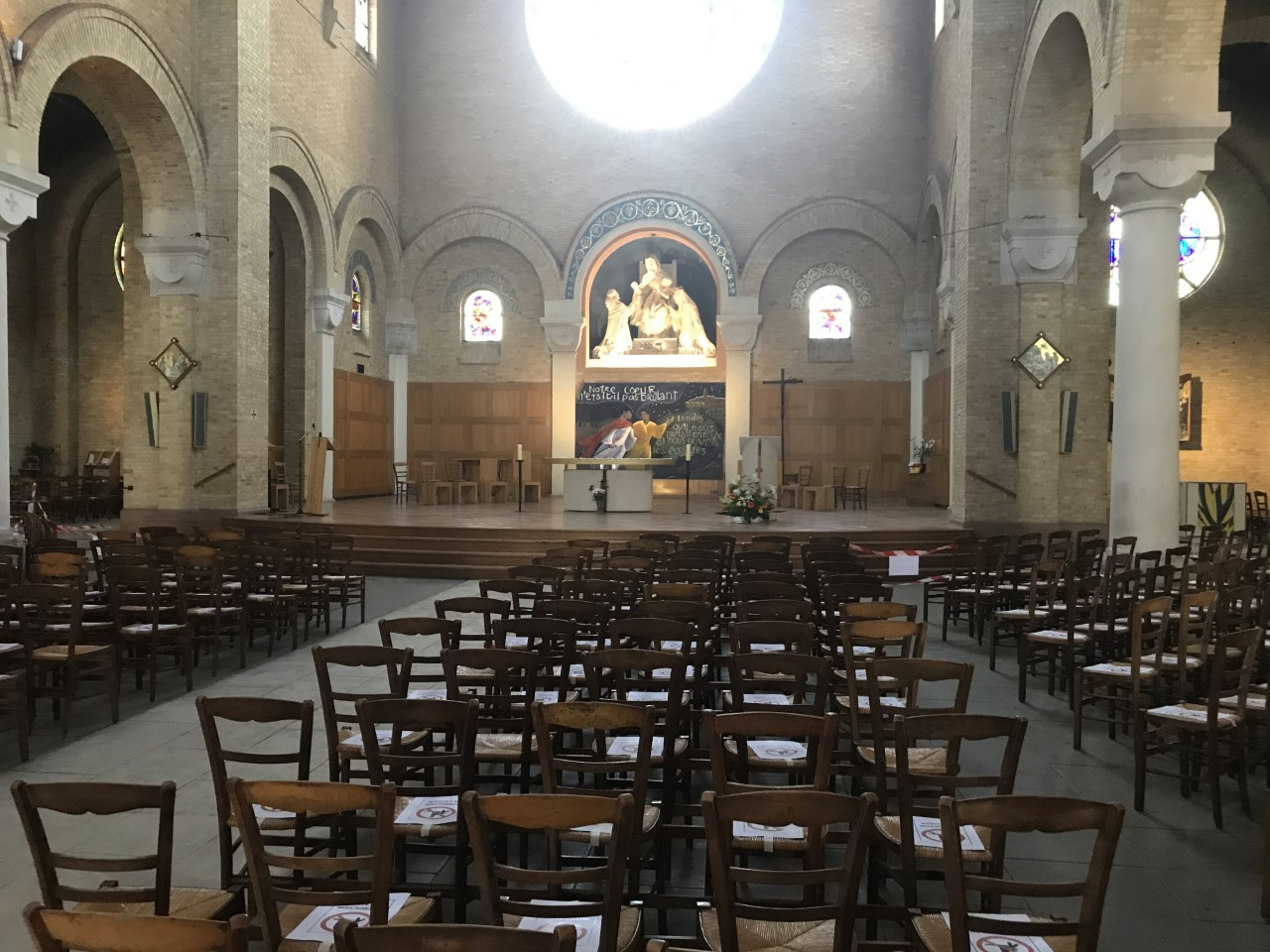
Nave facing the choir

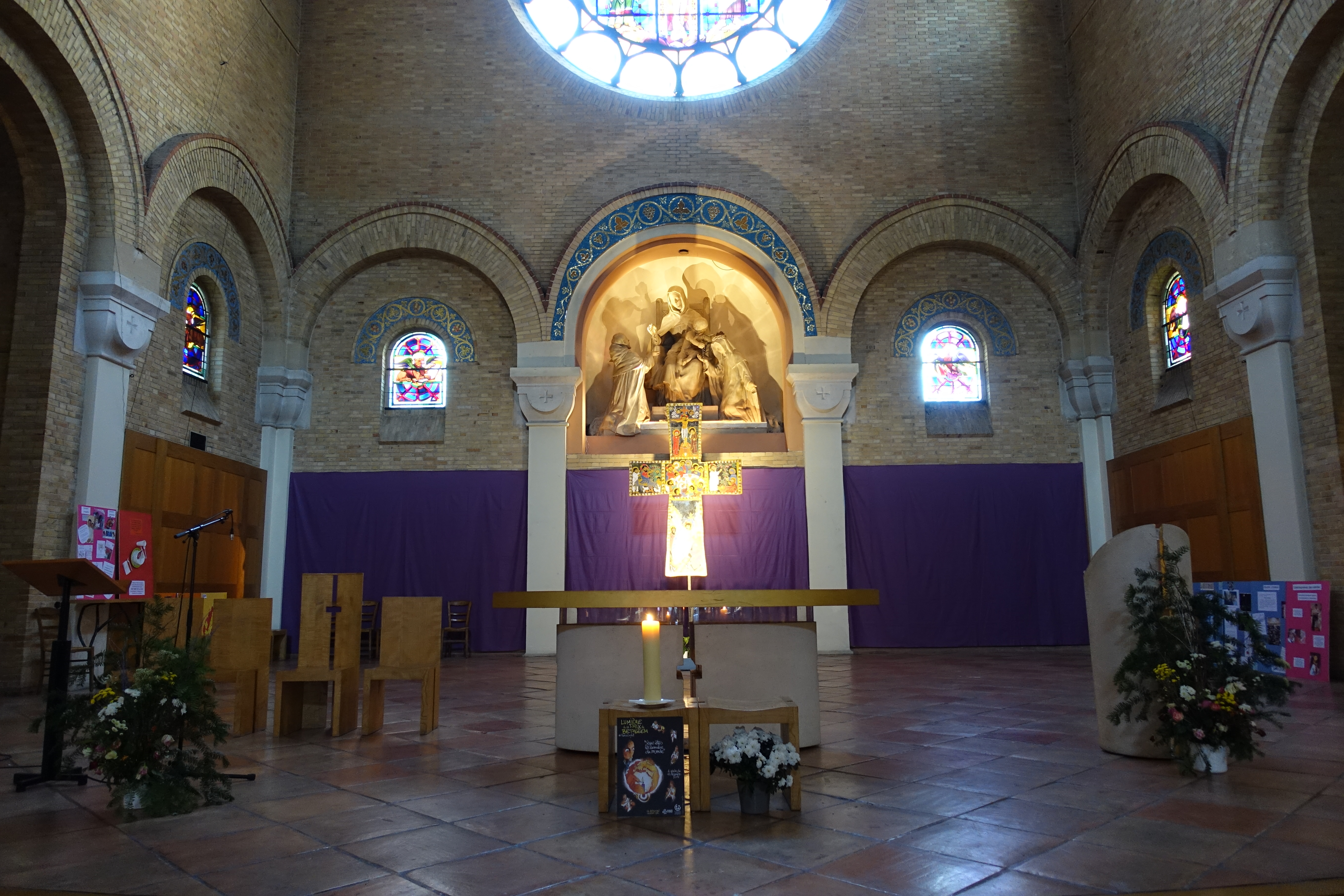
The altar

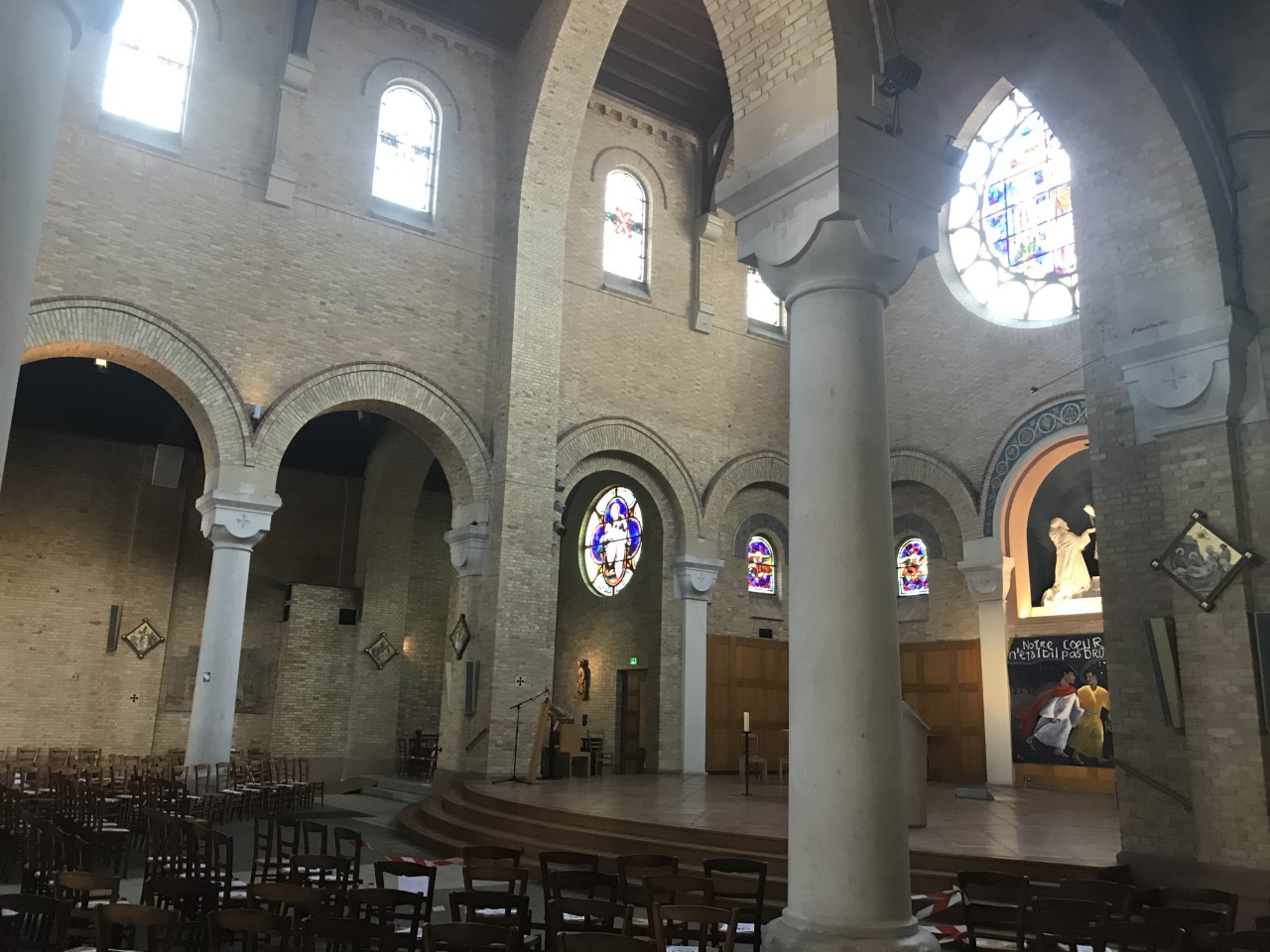
Side of the nave

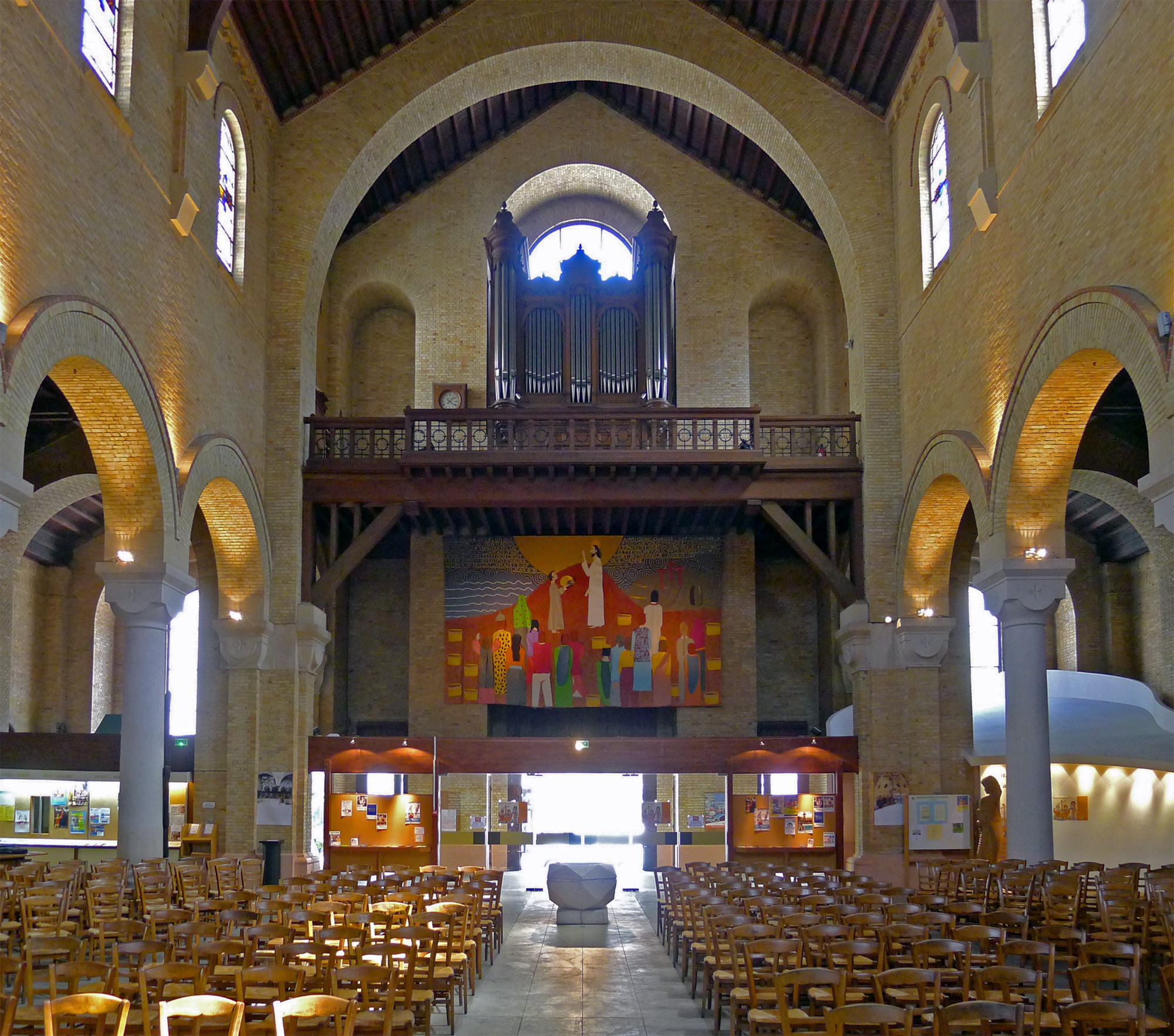
Tribune and organ

== Art and decoration ==
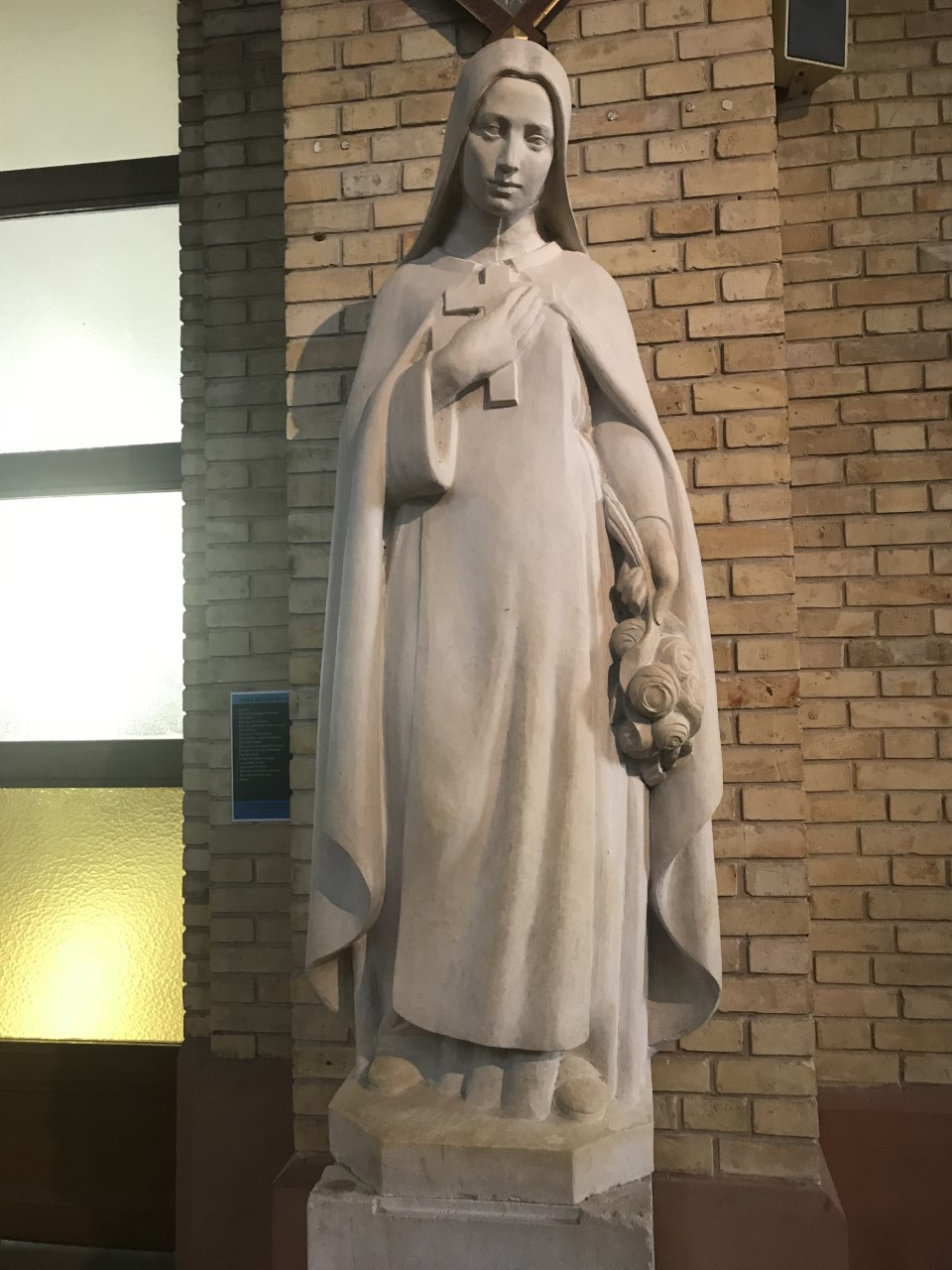
Saint Therese

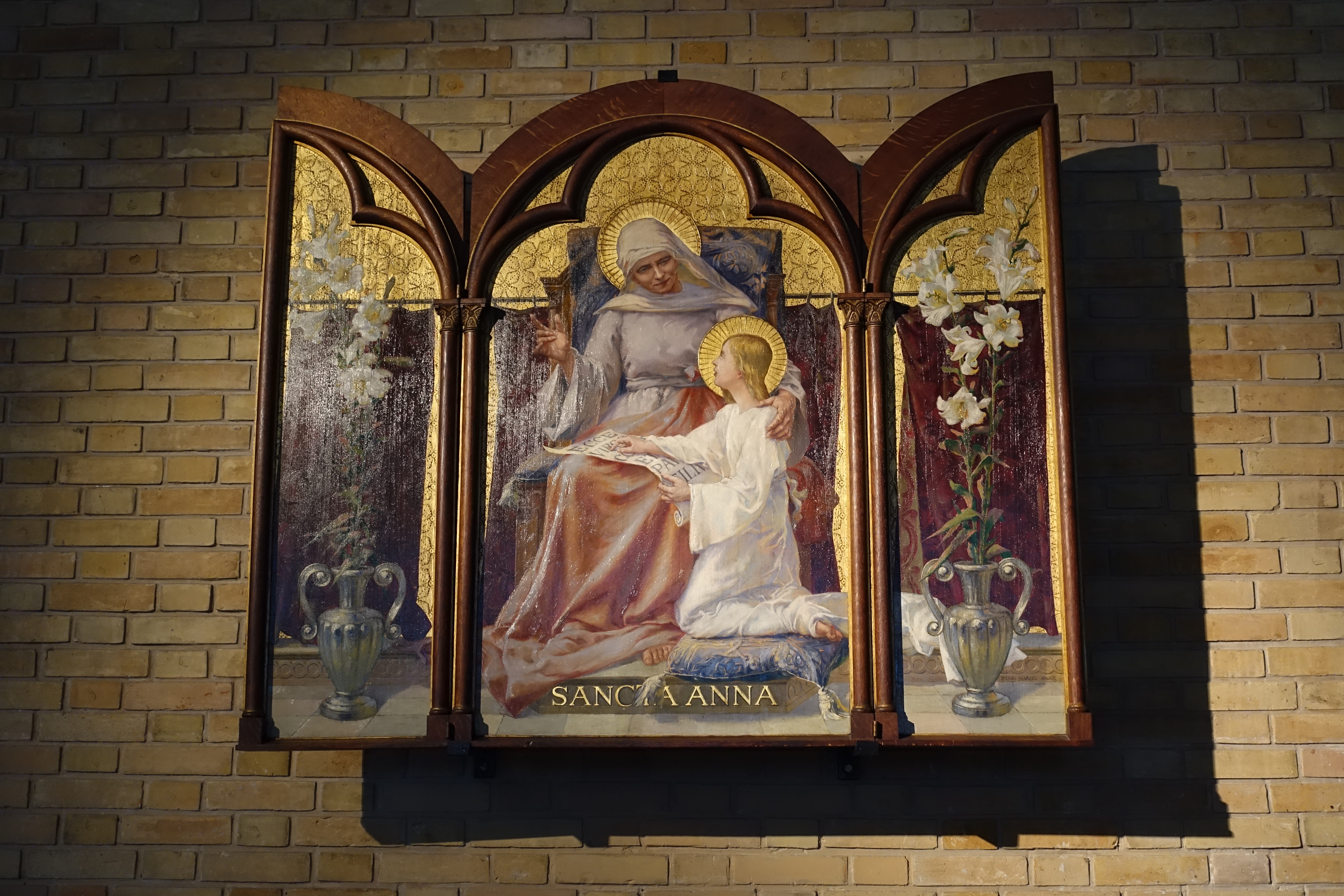
Saint Anne

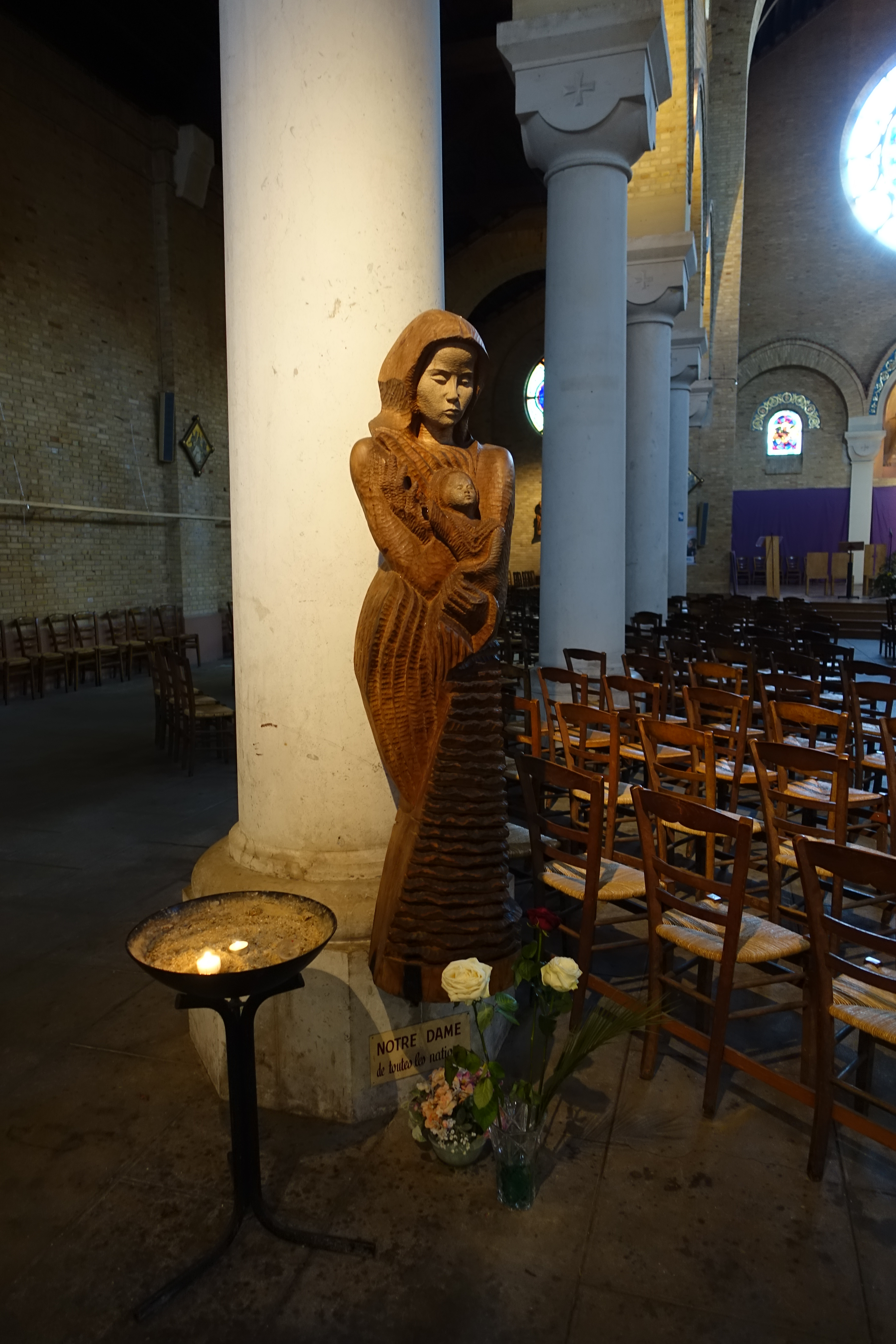
"Our Lady of Rosaire"

The most prominent decoration of the church interior is the array of colourful stained-glass windows made by Henri-Marcel Magne (1877–1944). This included several series of related windows, including the "Litanies of the Virgin" in the upper rows of windows in the nave, as Weill as windows depicting the Way of the Cross and three windows of The Education of the Virgin. Another series depicts animals associated with saints, such as the eagle and Saint John.

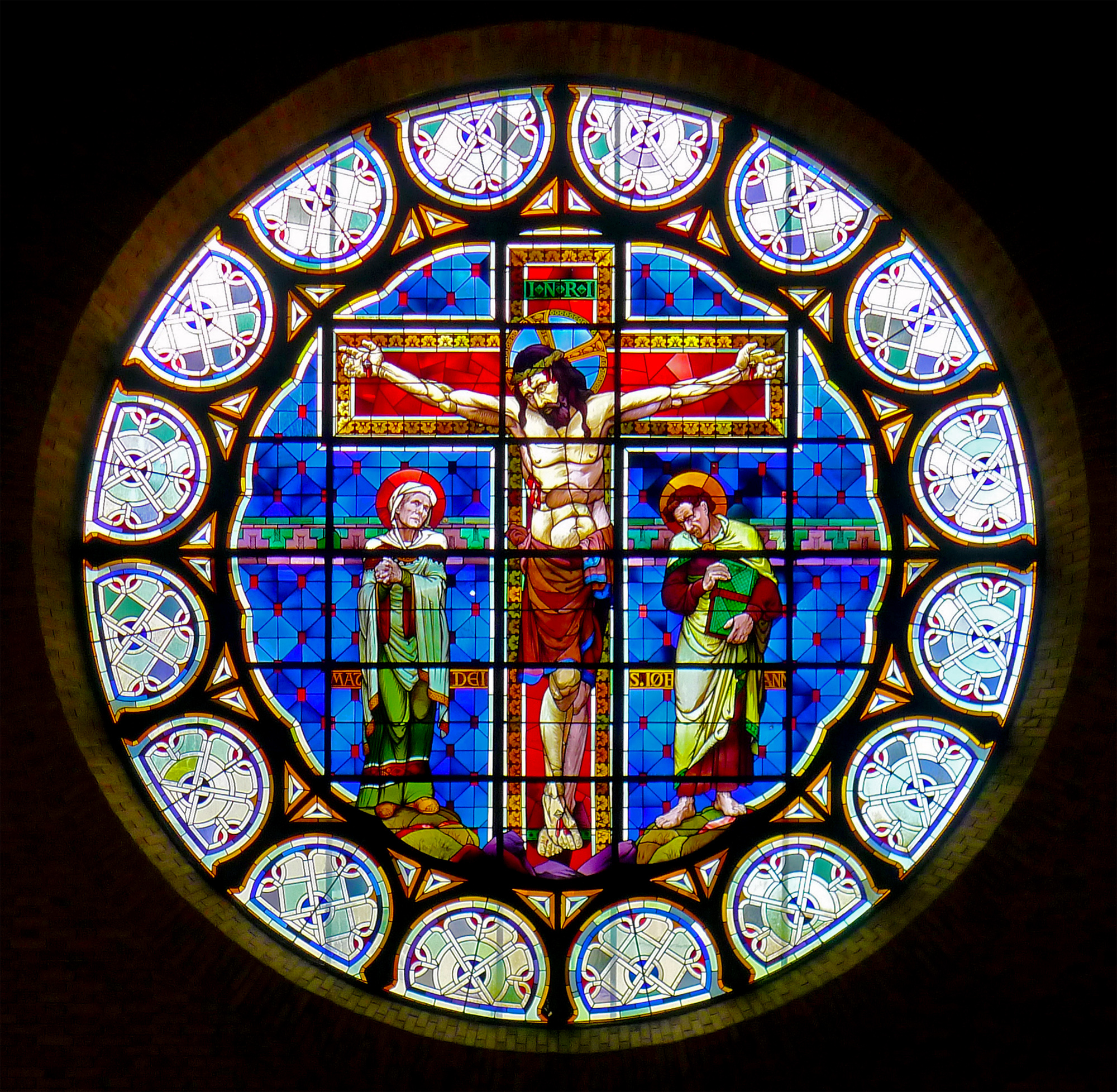
"The Crucifixion"

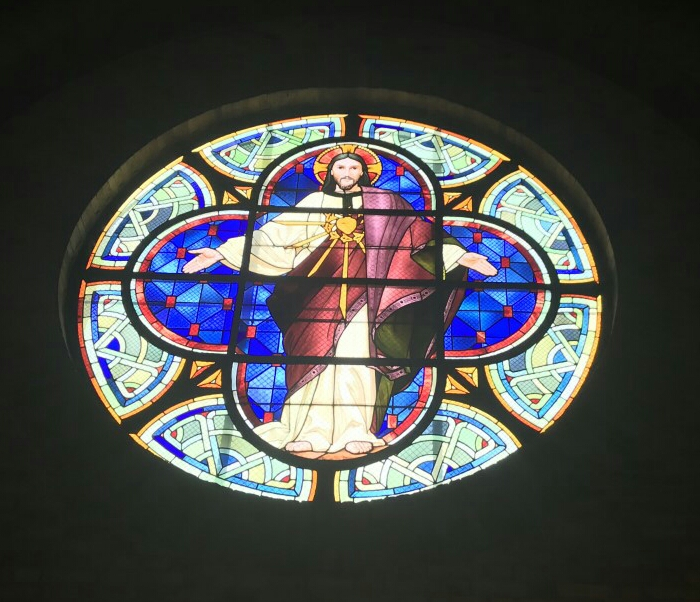
Christ

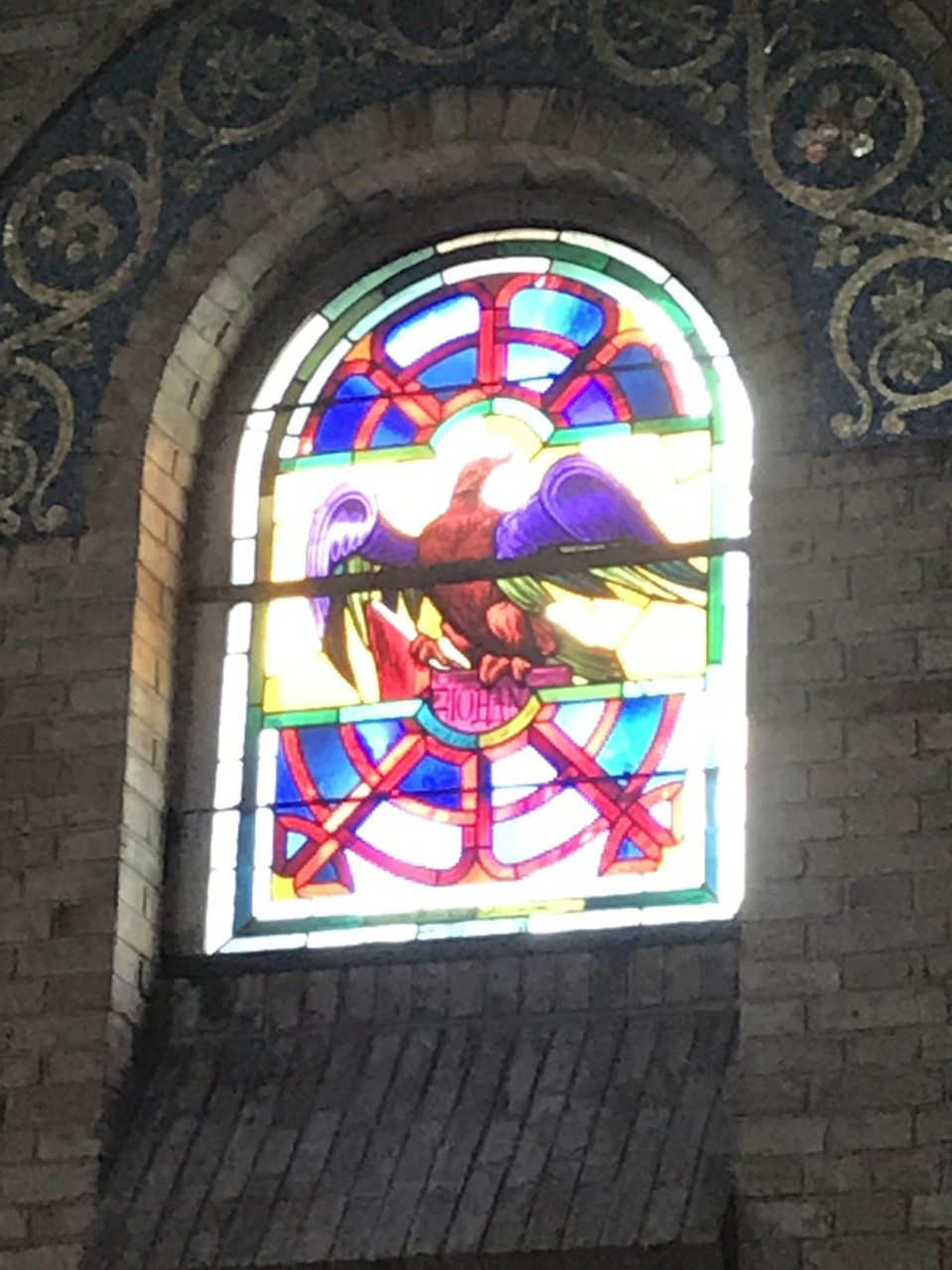
An Eagle (Saint John)

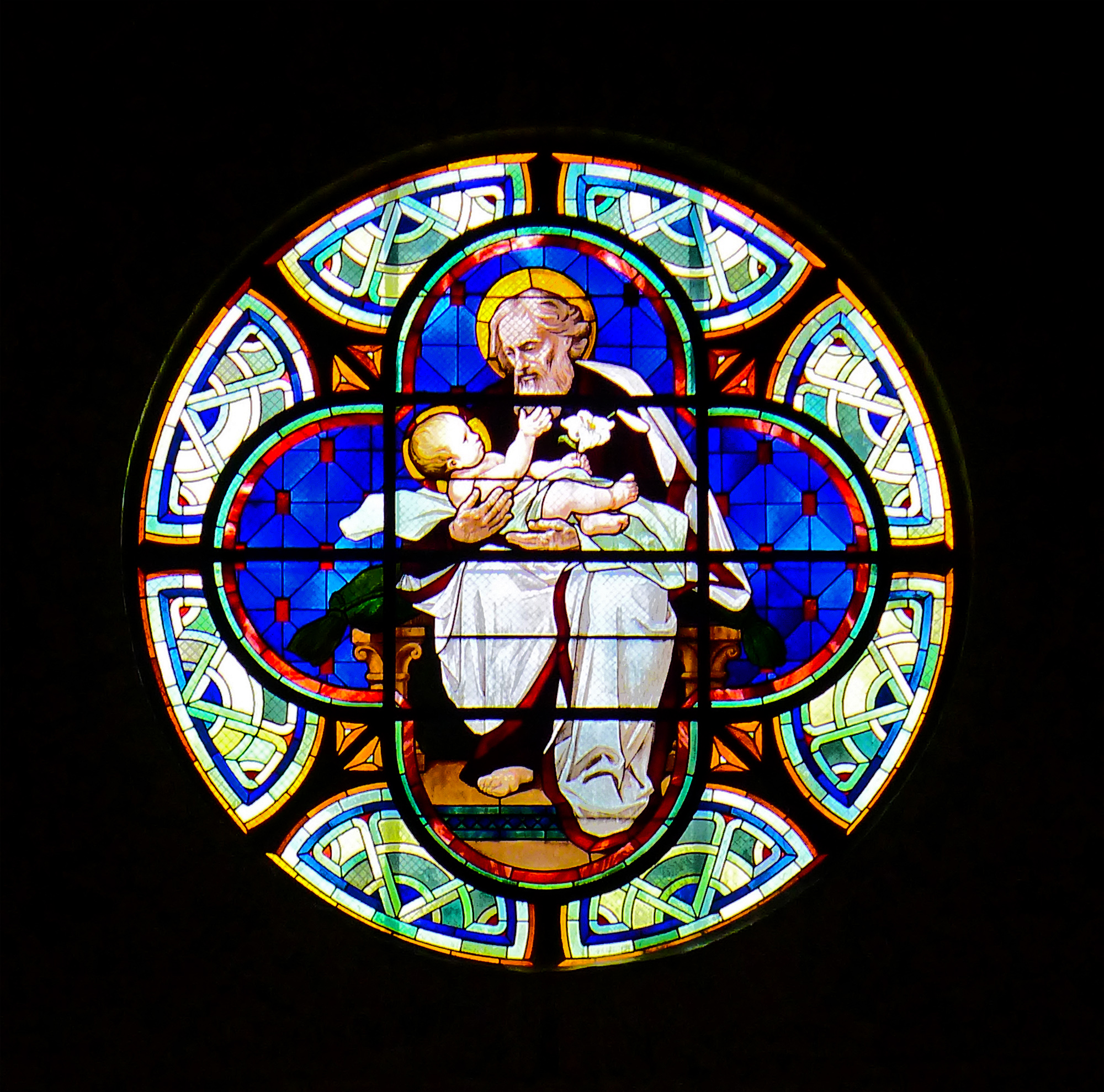
"Saint Joseph and the Christ child"

== Organ ==
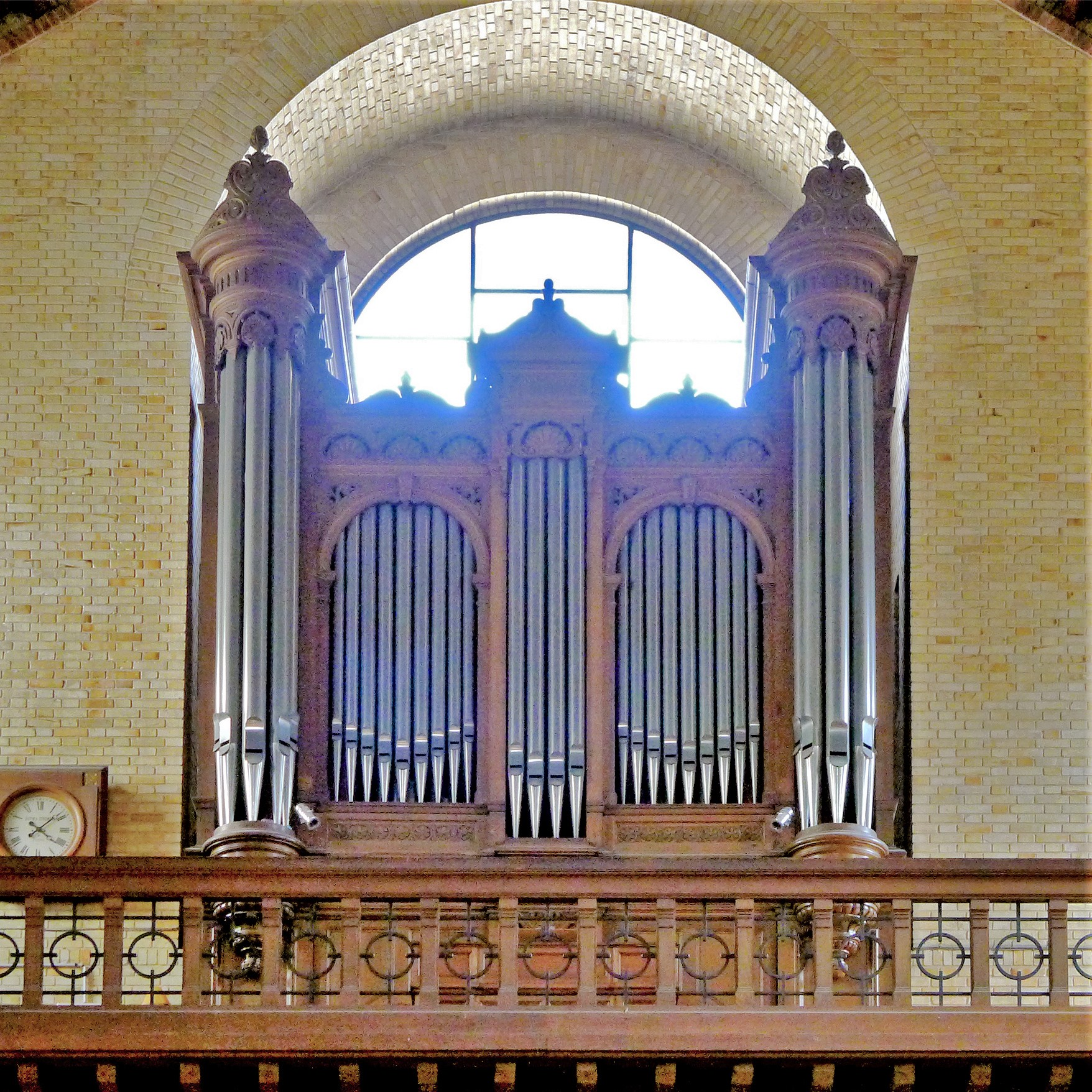
The Organ

The organ was built by the prominent firm of Aristide Cavaillé-Coll in 1880 for another church, and was bought for the church by the Abbot Boyreau in 1913. It was restored in 1945, and entirely renovated in the 1990s.
