= Rabah Bouaziz =

Algerian politician and veteran of the Algerian War

4th wali of Algiers Province
- In office August 8, 1964 – June 21, 1965
- Preceded by: Ahmed Hamiani
- Succeeded by: M'hamed Hadj Yala

Personal details
- Born: 1928; Tizi Rached, Tizi Ouzou Province, French Algeria
- Died: October 10, 2009; Algiers, Algeria
- Resting place: El Alia Cemetery, Algeria
- Political party: FLN

Military service
- Battles/wars: Algerian War

Rabah Bouaziz was an Algerian politician and veteran of the Algerian War who served as the fourth wali of Algiers Province between 1964 and 1965.

== Biography ==
Bouaziz was born in 1928 in Tizi Rached, Tizi Ouzou Province, French Algeria. He served in Algerian nationalist political and guerrilla organizations from a young age, with his nom de guerre being Si Saïd. In 1958, returning from a clandestine trip to Germany with other Algerian fighters, Bouaziz was apprehended at the border and taken into custody by French officials. After Algerian independence, Bouaziz became a deputy in the People's National Assembly during its first Congress. He was named wali of Algiers Province on August 8, 1965, after Ahmed Hamiani's departure.

Bouaziz served as wali until June 21, 1965, being fired from the position after the 1965 Algerian coup d'état two days earlier. Bouaziz died on October 11, 2009, at the El Azhar clinic in Algiers at the age of 81. His funeral took place at El Alia Cemetery.
