= Abdelkader Barakrok =

Secretary of State of Algeria in France
- In office June 1957 – November 1958
- Prime Minister: Maurice Bourges-Maunoury; Felix Gaillard

Personal details
- Born: 1915 Khenguet Sidi Nadji, Biskra, Algeria
- Died: October 31, 2006 (aged 90–91) 14th Arrondissement, Paris, France
- Occupation: Doctor

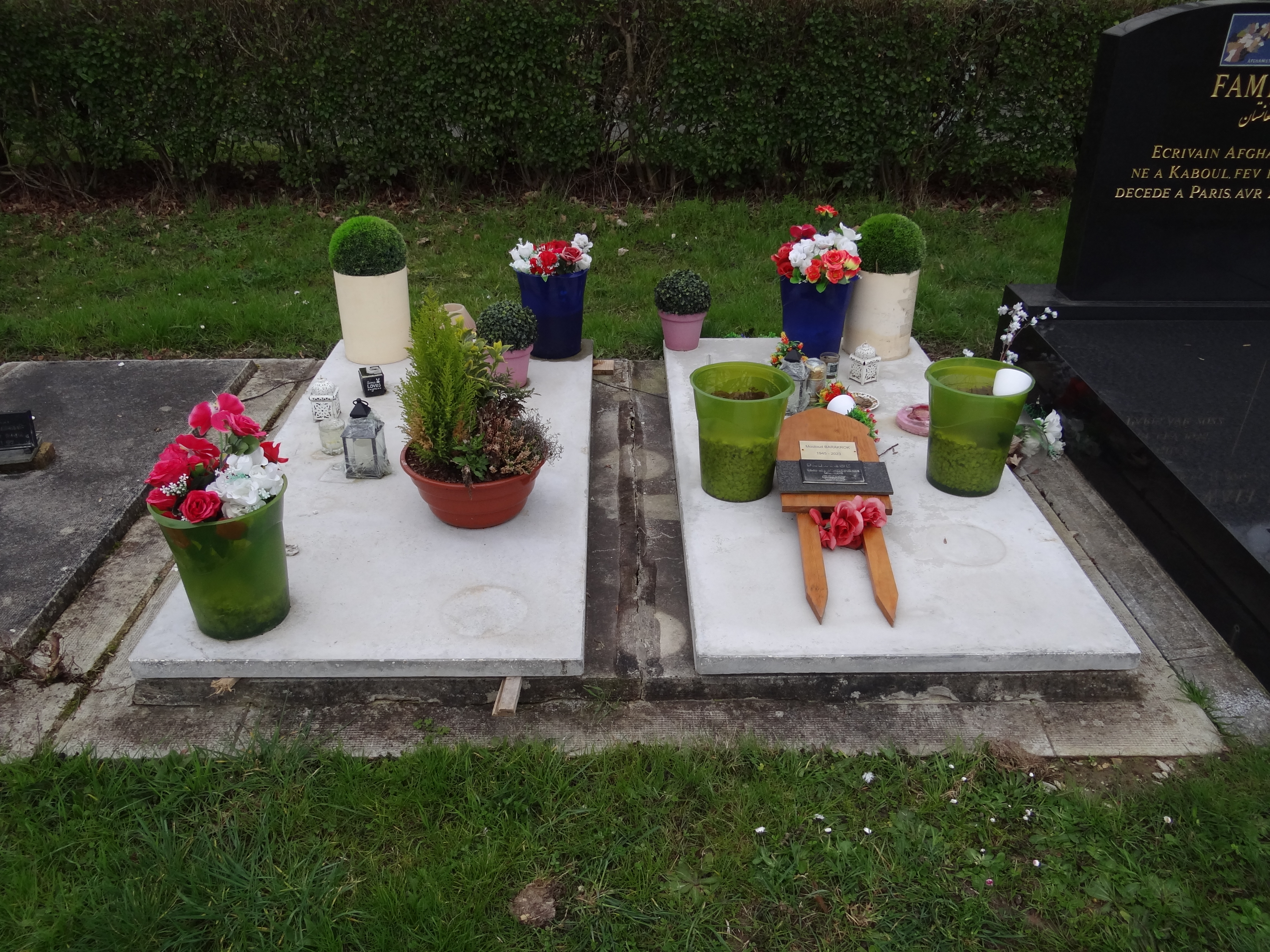
The tomb of Abdelkader Barakrok in the Parisian cemetery of Thiais in Val-de-Marne

Abdelkader Barakrok was a Franco-Algerian politician and doctor who served as the Secretary of State for Algeria in France during the Algerian War.

== Biography ==
Barakrok was born in 1915 in Khenguet Sidi Nadjil, near Biskra, Algeria. He was the son of a non-commissioned officer. Barakrok obtained his baccalaureate from Ahmed Reha Houhou High School in Constantine, and became a doctor after graduating from the Faculty of Medicine of Algiers. In 1937, he was put in charge of medical aid in Aurès. In 1948, he was elected municipal councilor of Khenchela. He then served as the general councilor of Constantine Department and later as a deputy in the Algerian assembly.

In 1957, Barakrok became the first Algerian Muslim to serve as Secretary of State in a government of the French republic. He served in the governments of Maurice Bourgès-Maunoury from June–September 1957 and Félix Gaillard from November 1957 to April 1958. During his stint as secretary of state, he was the victim of a failed attack on him. He settled permanently in Paris.

After his stint in politics, Barakrok joined the health inspectorate, in particular researching the health conditions of Muslims in France. Barakrok died on October 31, 2006, in Paris.
