= 14th arrondissement of Paris =

- Municipal arrondissement
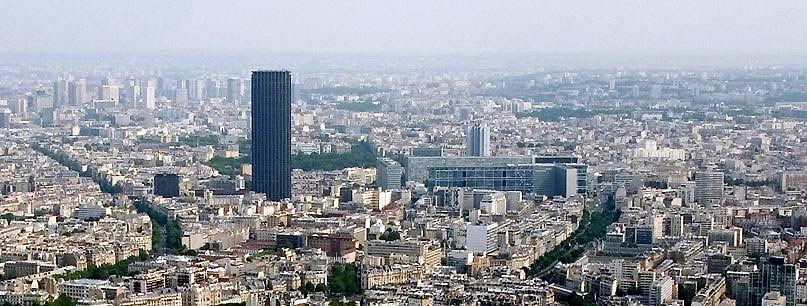
- View over the arrondissement, dominated by Tour Montparnasse

- Coat of arms

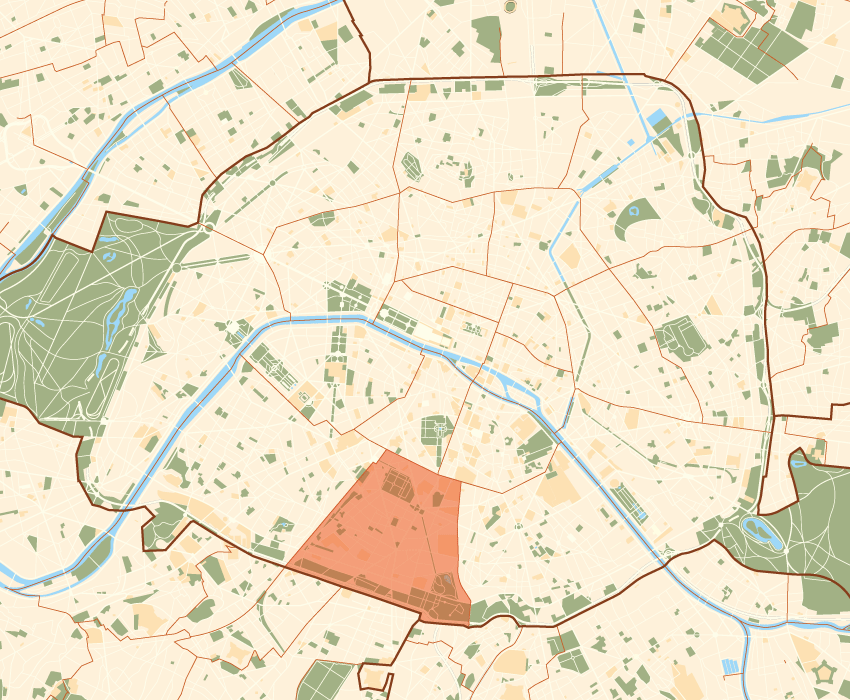
- Location within Paris
- Coordinates: 48°49′59″N 2°19′37″E
- Country: France
- Region: Île-de-France
- Department: Paris
- Commune: Paris

Government
  - Mayor (2026–2032): Carine Petit (The Ecologists)
- Area: 5.62 km^{2} (2.17 sq mi)
- Population (2023): 136,455
  - Density: 24,300/km^{2} (62,900/sq mi)
- INSEE code: 75114

The 14th arrondissement of Paris (French: XIV^{e} arrondissement [katɔʁzjɛm aʁɔ̃dismɑ̃]), officially named arrondissement de l'Observatoire (IPA: [aʁɔ̃dismɑ̃ də lɔpsɛʁvatwaʁ]; meaning "arrondissement of the Observatory"; named after the Paris Observatory), is one of the 20 arrondissements of Paris, the capital city of France. In 2023, it had a population of 136,455.

It is situated on the left bank of the River Seine, containing most of the Montparnasse district. Although today Montparnasse is best known for its skyscraper, Tour Montparnasse, as well as its major railway terminus, Gare Montparnasse, both are only partially located in the neighbouring 15th arrondissement. The district has traditionally been home to many artists as well as a significant Breton community, which arrived at the beginning of the 20th century upon the creation of the Montparnasse railway terminus.

Notable sites in the 14th arrondissement include the universities of Cité Internationale Universitaire de Paris and the Paris School of Economics, which is located near Parc Montsouris, Stade Charléty and the Catacombs of Paris.

Since 2014, the mayor of the 14th arrondissement is Carine Petit.

== Geography ==
The quarters of the 14th arrondissement

The land area of this arrondissement is 5.621km^{2} (2.17 sq. miles; 1,389 acres).

The arrondissement consists of four quarters:

- Quartier Montparnasse (53)
- Quartier Parc-de-Montsouris (54)
- Quartier Petit-Montrouge (55)
- Quartier Plaisance (56)

== Demography ==
The 14th arrondissement attained its peak population in 1954 when it had 181,414 inhabitants. It continues to have a high density of both population and business activity with 71,836 jobs as of the 1999 census.

=== Historical population ===
Historical population

Year	Pop.	±% p.a.
1861	52,594	—
1872	69,611	+2.58%
1881	92,323	+3.19%
1891	112,638	+2.01%
1901	142,695	+2.39%
1911	163,523	+1.37%
1921	171,292	+0.47%
1931	178,230	+0.40%
1936	178,612	+0.04%
1946	175,581	−0.17%
1954	181,414	+0.41%

Year	Pop.	±% p.a.
1962	178,149	−0.23%
1968	167,093	−1.06%
1975	149,137	−1.61%
1982	138,596	−1.04%
1990	136,574	−0.18%
1999	132,844	−0.31%
2007	134,382	+0.14%
2012	141,102	+0.98%
2017	135,964	−0.74%
2023	136,455	+0.06%

Source: Demographia (1861-1999) and INSEE (1876-2023)

=== Immigration ===
Place of birth of residents of the 14th arrondissement in 1999
Born in metropolitan France	Born outside metropolitan France			
78.4%	21.6%			
78.4%	Born in overseas France	Born in foreign countries with French citizenship at birth^{1}	EU-15 immigrants^{2}	Non-EU-15 immigrants
78.4%	1.4%	4.3%	4.4%	11.5%
^{1} This group is made up largely of former French settlers, such as pieds-noirs in Northwest Africa, followed by former colonial citizens who had French citizenship at birth (such as was often the case for the native elite in French colonies), as well as to a lesser extent foreign-born children of French expatriates. A foreign country is understood as a country not part of France in 1999, so a person born for example in 1950 in Algeria, when Algeria was an integral part of France, is nonetheless listed as a person born in a foreign country in French statistics.^{2} An immigrant is a person born in a foreign country not having French citizenship at birth. An immigrant may have acquired French citizenship since moving to France, but is still considered an immigrant in French statistics. On the other hand, persons born in France with foreign citizenship (the children of immigrants) are not listed as immigrants.

== Economy ==
Aéroports de Paris has its head office in the arrondissement. In addition Société d'exploitation de l'hebdomadaire Le Point (SEBDO Le Point), the company that operates Le Point, has its head office in the arrondissement.

SNCF, the French rail company, formerly had its head office in Montparnasse and the 14th arrondissement.

== Government and infrastructure ==
La Santé Prison, operated by the Ministry of Justice, is in the arrondissement.

The head office of the Agency for French Education Abroad (AEFE), the French international schooling network, is located in the arrondissement.

== Culture ==
The International Astronomical Union head office is located on the second floor of the Institut d'Astrophysique de Paris. The Théâtre Rive Gauche is located at 6, rue de la Gaîté. Several contemporary art galleries are also located in the 14th arrondissement, such as the Fondation Cartier pour l'Art Contemporain, the Musée Adzak and the Gallery of Montparnasse.

== Cityscape ==
=== Places of interest ===
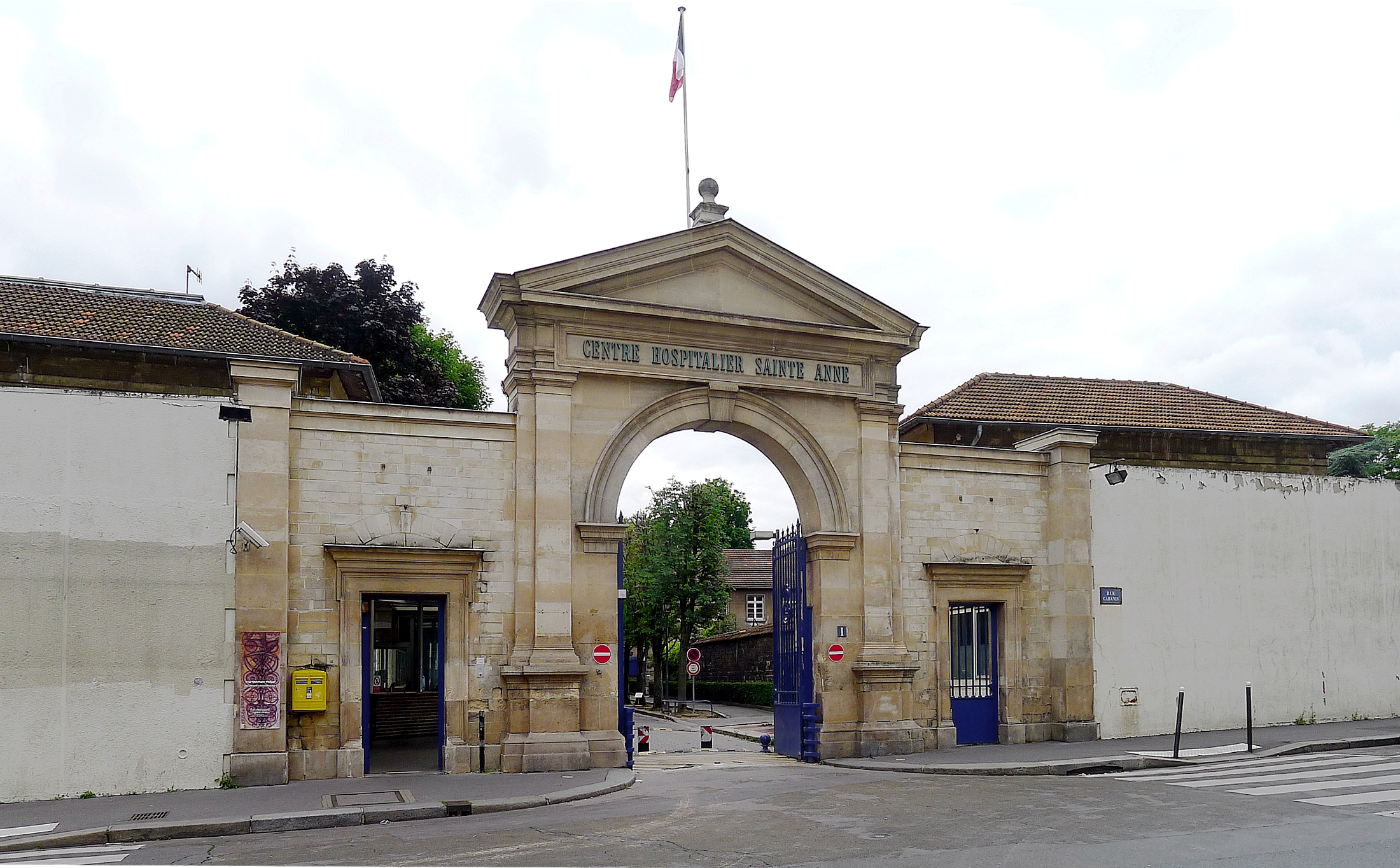
Sainte-Anne Hospital Center, gate No. 1, Rue Cabanis.

- Paris Catacombs museum
- Cimetière du Montparnasse
- Fondation Cartier pour l'Art Contemporain
- Gare Montparnasse
- Michael Servetus statue
- Montparnasse area
- Musée Lenine
- Musée Jean Moulin
- Paris Observatory
- La Santé Prison
- Tour Montparnasse
- Sainte-Anne Hospital Center
- Notre-Dame-du-Travail, Paris
- Saint-Dominique Church (Paris)
- Notre-dame-du-Rosaire, Paris

=== Main streets and squares ===
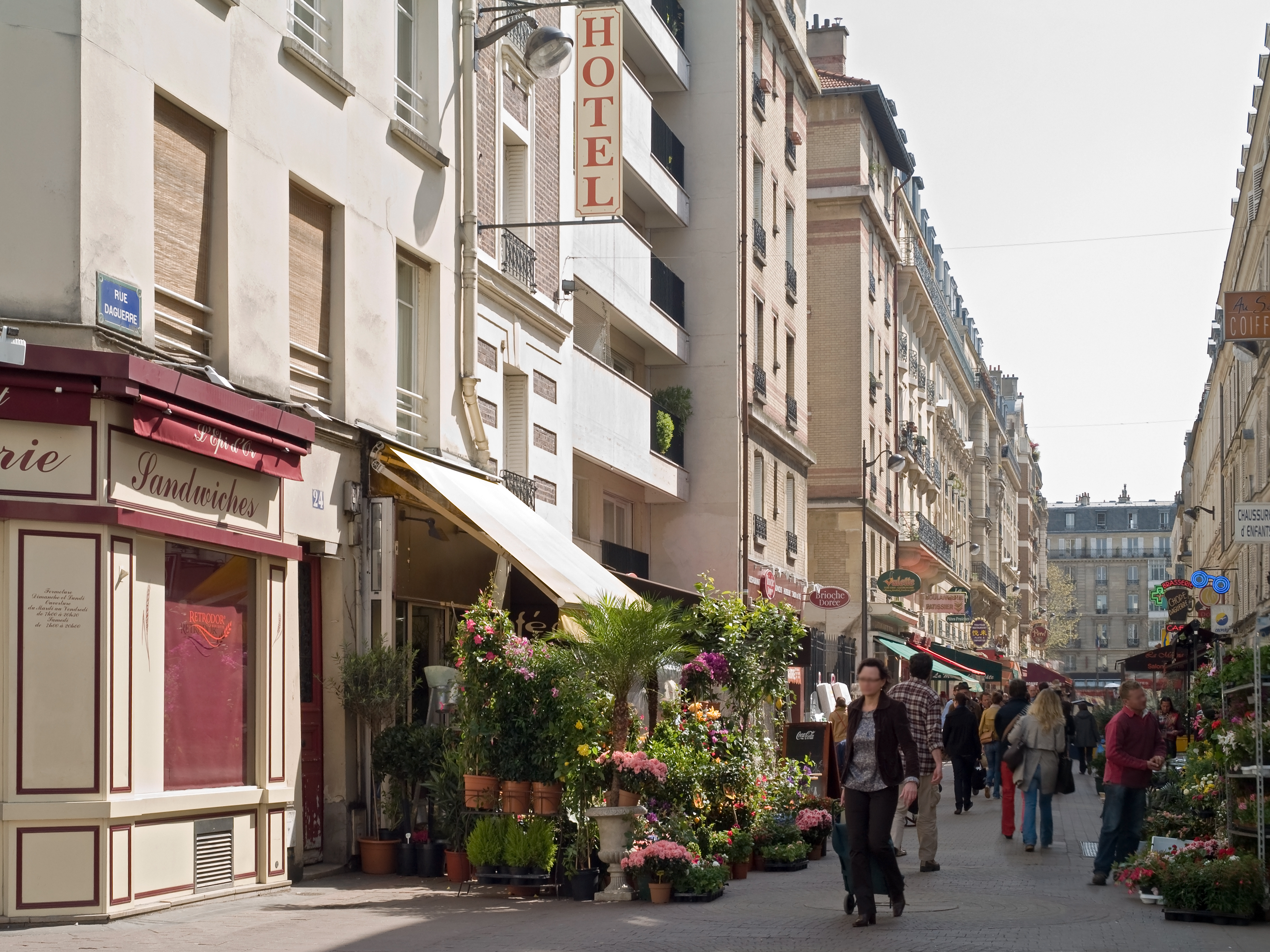
Pedestrian street in the 14th arrondissement of Paris

- Rue de l'Arrivée
- Place Denfert-Rochereau
- Rue Delambre
- Rue du Départ
- Place Edgar Quinet
- Avenue du Maine
- Boulevard du Montparnasse
- Boulevard Raspail
