= List of foreign cultural institutes in Paris =

This article provides a list of foreign cultural institutes in Paris. Not all of these institutes are still operational.

Name	Country	Arrondissement	Address
Atelier Néerlandais	Netherlands	1	22 avenue Victoria
Institut de la mémoire arménienne	Armenia	2	47 rue de Cléry
Institut historique allemand	Germany	3	8 rue du Parc-Royal
Centre culturel suisse	Switzerland	3	32 rue des Francs-Bourgeois
Centre culturel suédois	Sweden	3	11 rue Payenne
Instituto de México à Paris	Mexico	3	119 rue Vieille-du-Temple
Europe Mosaïques Île-de-France	Multination	3	58 rue du Vertbois
Centre culturel de Serbie	Serbia	4	123 rue Saint-Martin
Centre Wallonie-Bruxelles	Belgium	4	7 rue de Venise
Polish Library in Paris	Poland	4	6 quai d'Orléans
Centre culturel d'Égypte à Paris	Egypt	5	111 boulevard Saint-Michel
Centre culturel irlandais	Ireland	5	5 rue des Irlandais
Institut finlandais	Finland	5	60 rue des Écoles
Centre culturel du Maroc	Morocco	5	115 boulevard Saint Michel
Centre culturel d'Iran	Iran	6	6 rue Jean-Bart
Centre culturel tchèque	Czech Republic	6	18 rue Bonaparte
Institut hongrois	Hungary	6	92 rue Bonaparte
Mission culturelle du Luxembourg en France	Luxembourg	7	33 avenue Rapp
Centre culturel Britannique	United Kingdom	7	9 rue de Constantine
Terra Foundation for American Art	United States	7	121 rue de Lille
Fondation Calouste Gulbenkian Paris	Portugal	7	39 boulevard de la Tour-Maubourg
Centre culturel arabe syrien de Paris	Syria	7	12 avenue de Tourville
Centre culturel de Chine	China	7	1 boulevard de la Tour-Maubourg
Centre culturel de Taiwan à Paris	Taiwan	7	78 rue de l'Université
Forum culturel autrichien	Austria	7	17 avenue de Villars
Institut culturel italien	Italy	7	73 rue de Grenelle
Institut culturel roumain	Romania	7	1 rue de l'Exposition
Maison de l'Amérique latine	Multination	7	217 boulevard Saint-Germain
Service culturel de l'Ambassade d'Azerbaïdjan	Azerbaijan	7	1 avenue Charles-Floquet
Centre culturel canadien	Canada	8	130 Rue du Faubourg Saint-Honoré
Institut estonien en France	Estonia	8	3 rue Robert-Estienne
Centre culturel et d'information de l'Ambassade d'Ukraine	Ukraine	8	22 avenue Messine
Institut culturel bulgare	Bulgaria	8	28 rue La Boëtie
Institut polonais	Poland	8	31 rue Jean-Goujon
Institut Ramon Llull	Spain	8	3 rue La Boétie
Institut Cervantes de Paris	Spain	8	7 rue Quentin-Bauchart
Danish House in Paris	Denmark	8	142 avenue des Champs-Élysées
Institut Yunus Emre	Turkey	8	102 avenue des Champs-Elysées
Centre culturel Anatolie	Multination	9	77 rue La Fayette
Centre de recherches sur la diaspora arménienne	Armenia	9	9 rue Cadet
Institut kurde de Paris	Multination	10	106 rue La Fayette
Maison de la culture yiddish	Multination	10	29 rue du Château-d'Eau
Chypre culture	Cyprus	10	2 rue de Marseille
American Center for the Arts	United States	11	27 rue Keller
Maison d'Europe et d'Orient	Multination	12	3 passage Hennel
Centre culturel du Vietnam	Vietnam	13	19 rue Albert
Maison de l'Albanie	Albania	14	26 place Denfert-Rochereau
Centre culturel algérien	Algeria	15	171 rue de la Croix-Nivert
Maison de la culture du Japon	Japan	15	101 quai Branly
Institut culturel Franco-Palestinien	Palestine	16	18 rue du Général-Malleterre
Centre culturel hellénique	Greece	16	23 rue Galilée
Centre culturel coréen	South Korea	16	2 avenue d'Iéna
Centre de Russie pour la science et la culture	Russia	16	61 rue Boissière
Délégation générale du Québec	Canada	16	66 rue Pergolèse
Goethe-Institut de Paris	Germany	16	17 avenue d'Iéna
Bureau culturel de l'ambassade d'Égypte	Egypt	16	56 avenue d'Iéna
Institut slovaque de Paris	Slovakia	16	125 rue du Ranelagh
Institut culturel Camões	Portugal	16	26 rue Raffet
American Center for Art and Culture (1986-2022)	United States	16	34 avenue de New-York

== Gallery ==
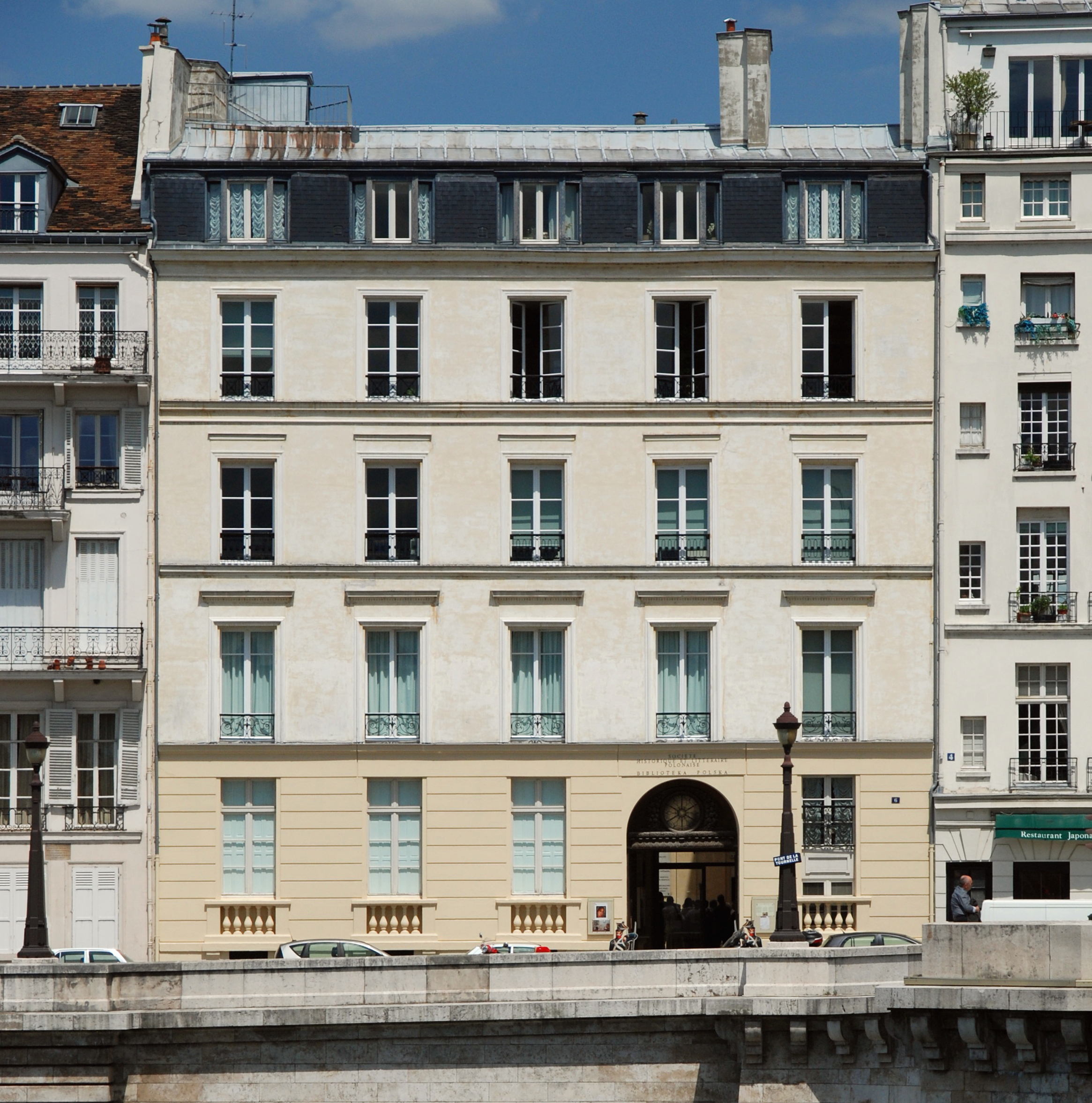
Bibliothèque polonaise

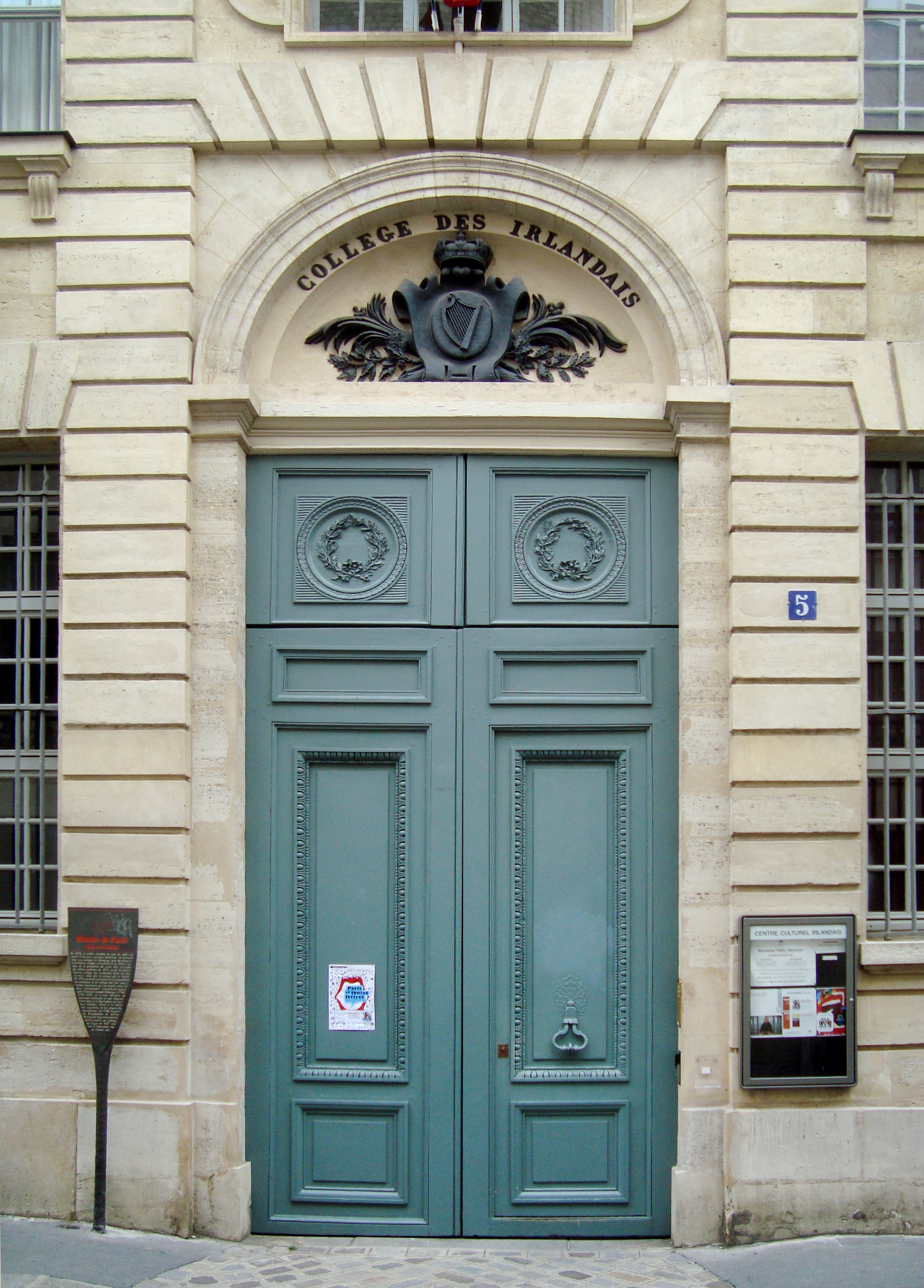
Centre culturel irlandais

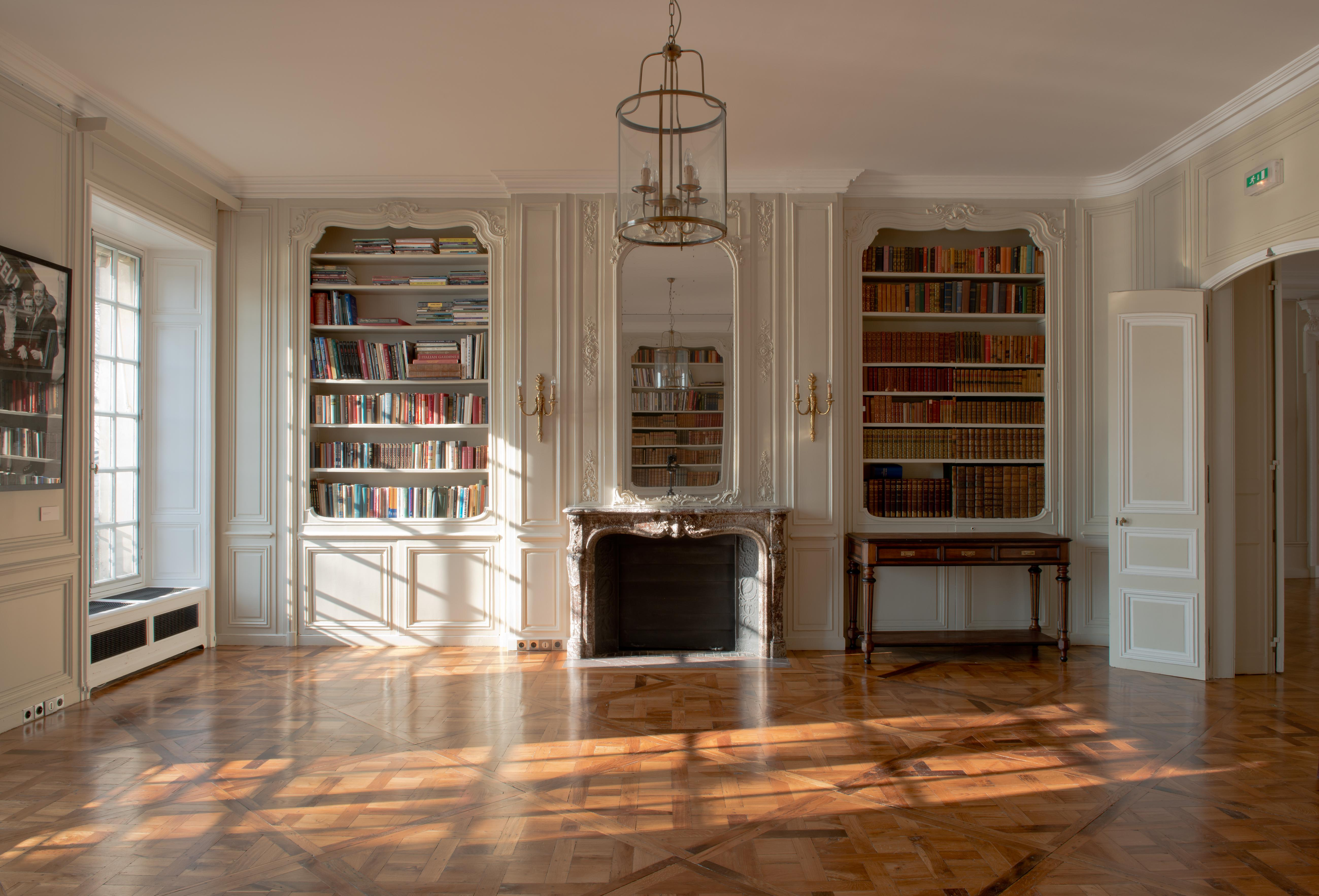
Mona Bismarck Foundation

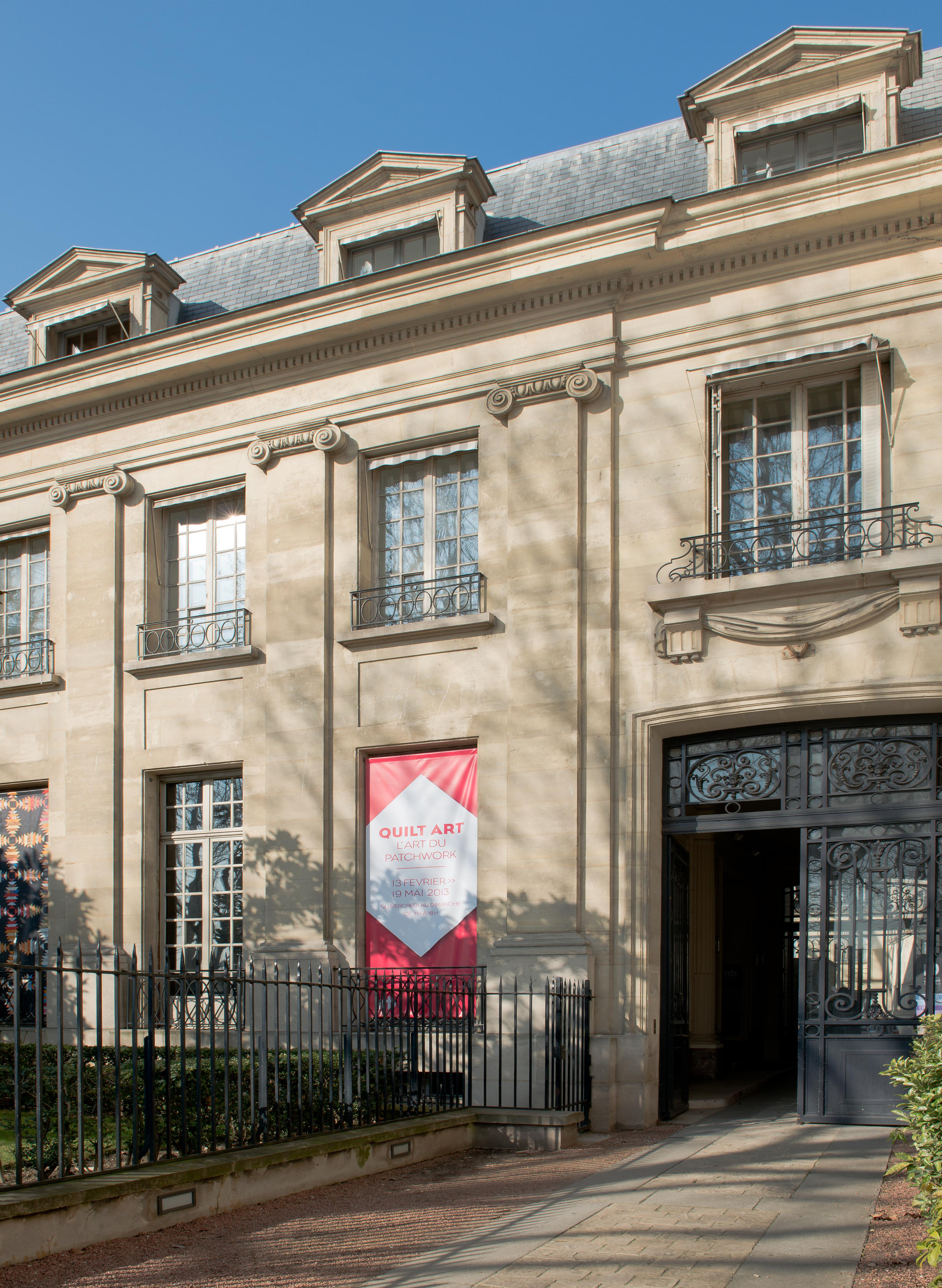
Mona Bismarck Foundation

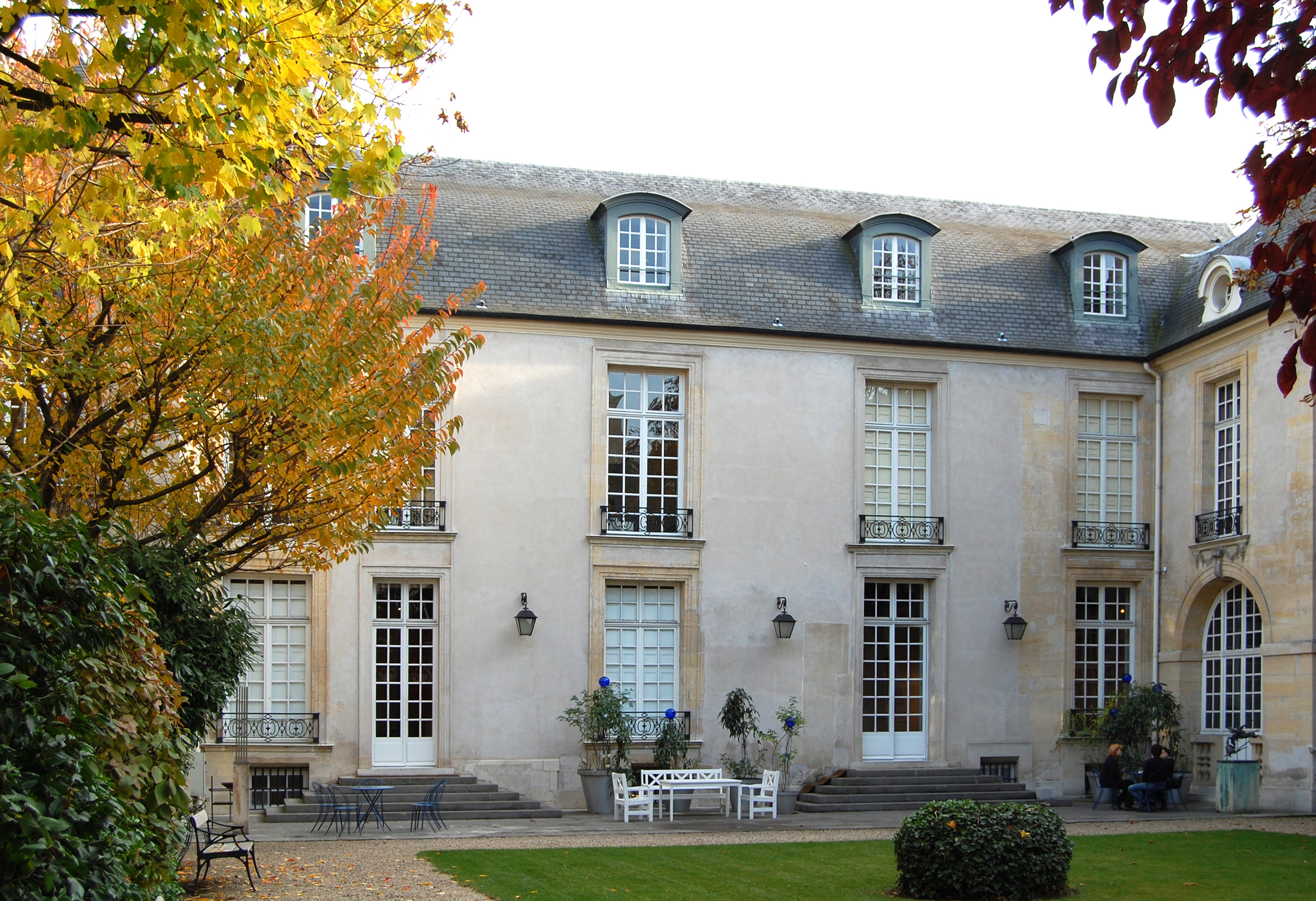
Centre culturel suédois

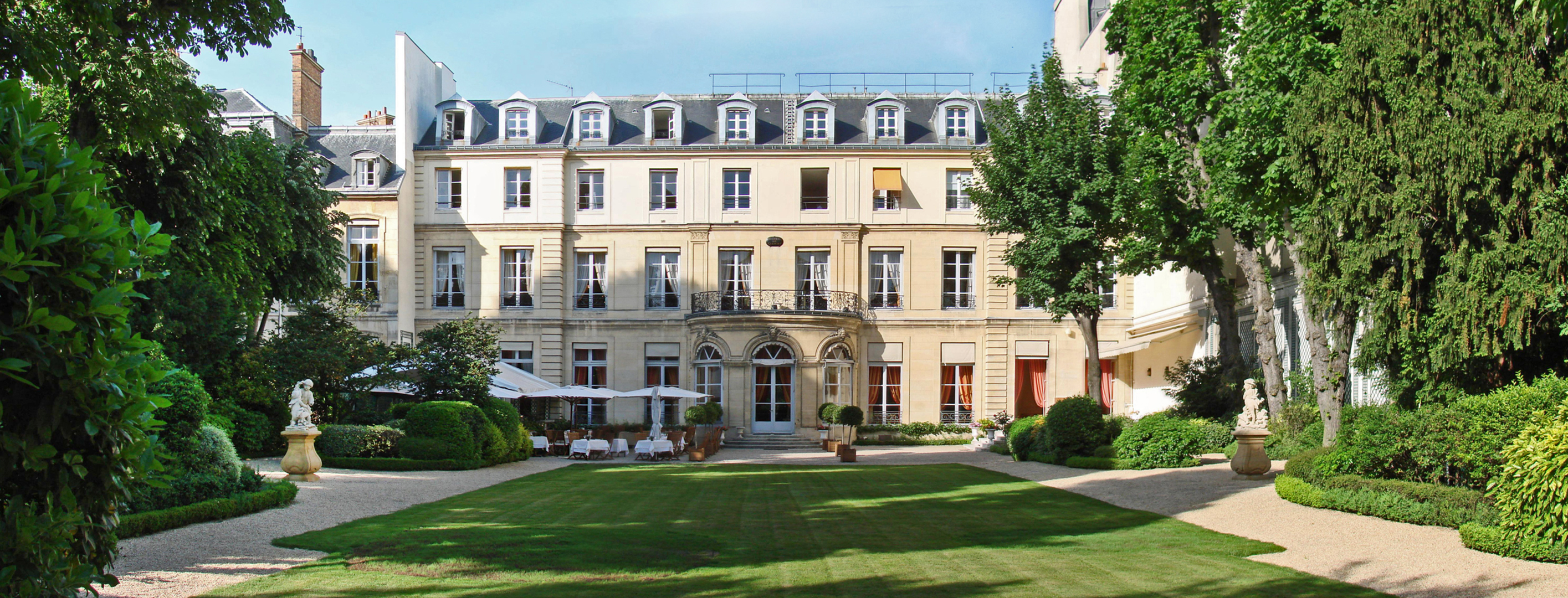
Maison de l'Amérique latine

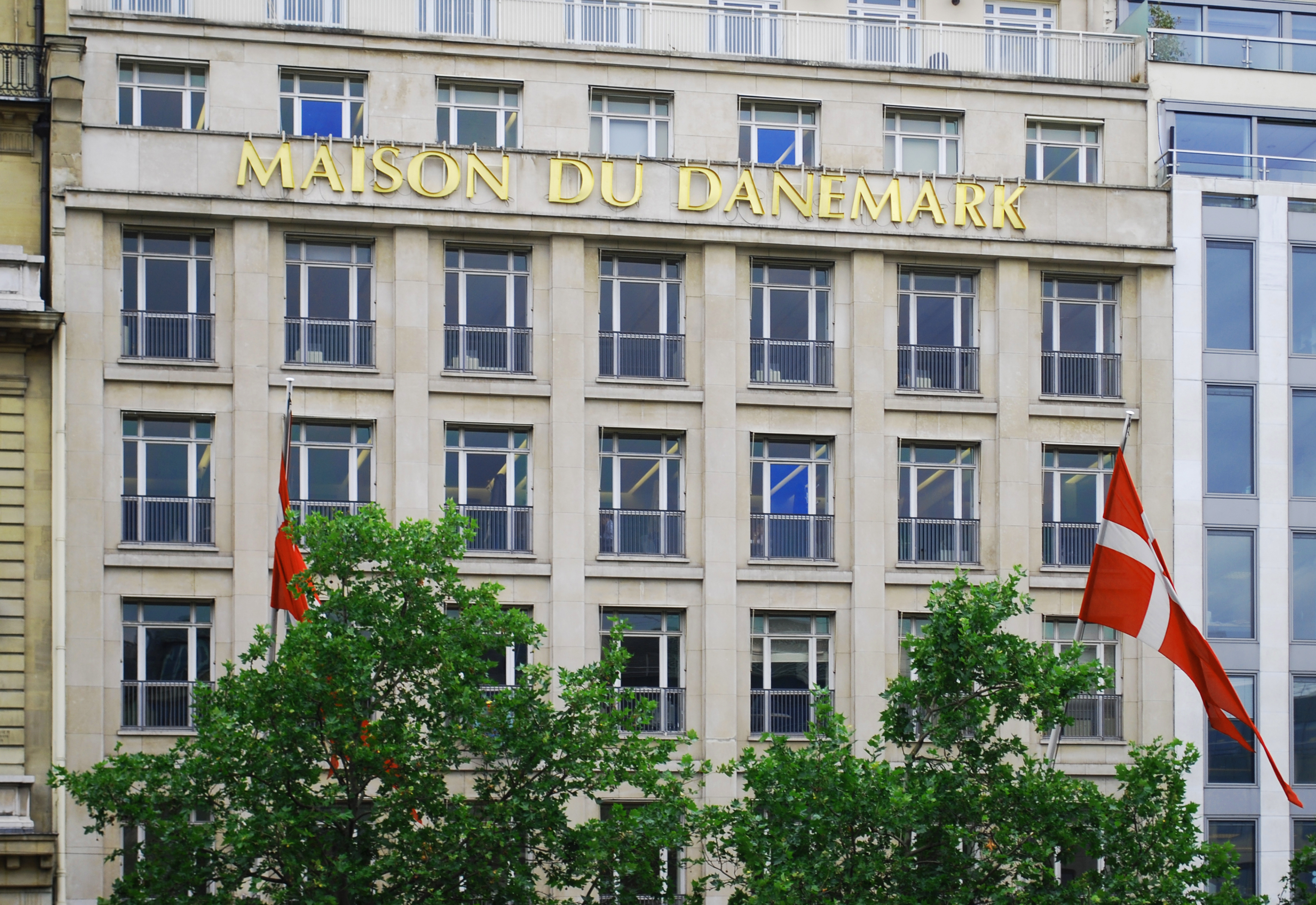
Maison du Danemark
