= Prix Makomi =

Literary award

The European Award For Congolese Literature, known as the Prix Makomi, is an annual literary prize awarded by the European Union National Institutes for Culture. The prize ceremony is held annually at the Fête du Livre de Kinshasa, which takes place November 12-16. The prize is awarded annually in three categories: Best Short story, Best Novel, and Best Poem. Additional prizes include the honorary diploma and special mentions.

== History ==
The prize was started by EUNIC in order to promote publishing of books in the DRC. The prize is now supported by the European Union delegation through the many European cultural institutions in the DRC, including the Centre Wallonie-Bruxelles, Goethe-Institut, Institut français, Académie des Beaux-Arts and Instituto Camões.

== Laureates ==
Prix Makomi winners
Year	Author	French title	Prize	Notes
2017	Isidore Ndaywel			
2017	Didier Mumengi		Prize of Honor	
2017	Jean-Claude Ntuala	La Vingt-cinquième lettre	Best Short Story	—
2018	Laurent Kasindi			
2019	Eric Ntumba	Une vie après le Styx	Best Book	—
2020	Jonathan Kapinga	Jeunesse insoumise: mon pro domo	Special Mention	—
2020	Eddie Tambwe	Ali - Foreman - Mobutu - King	Special Mention	—
2020	In Koli Jean Bofane		Prize of Honor	
2020	Maggy Bizwazwa	Requiem pour Andali	Special Mention	
