= Danish House in Paris =

Coordinates: 48°52′23″N 2°17′56″E

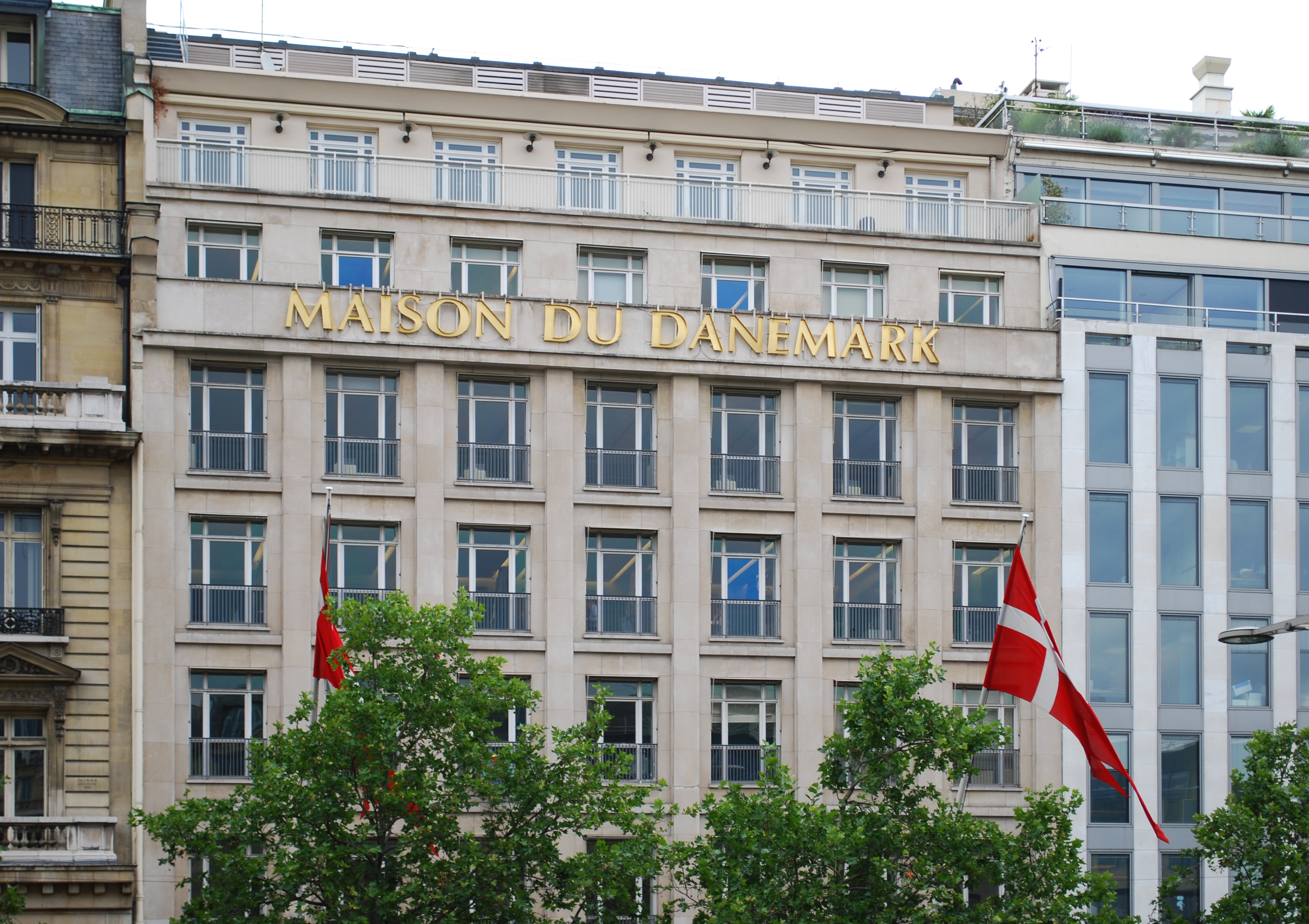
Maison du Danemark

House of Denmark (French: Maison du Danemark, Danish: Danmarkshuset), on 142 Champs-Élysées in Paris, France, is a building which houses exhibition space used for the presentation of Danish culture and commercial interests. The main venue of the house is the Salle du Danemark on the second floor. It also contains a Danish restaurant on the ground floor and office space rented out for international companies.

== History ==
The idea for a House of Denmark abroad was conceived after the Brussels International Exposition in 1935 where Thyse Hvass represented Denmark with his single-family houses. The plans were delayed by the coming of World War II but in 1948 the Danish state acquired the l'Hôtel Subiran on Champs-Élysées.

In 1952 the hotel was demolished to make way for the new building which had been designed by Hvass. Ground was broken on 23 September 1952 in the presence of the Danish prime minister Erik Eriksen and the French minister of foreign affairs Robert Schuman. The house was inaugurated on 23 April 1955 with a ceremony attended by King Frederik IX of Denmark, Queen Ingrid, Danish prime minister H. C. Hansen, the French president René Coty, Edgar Faure, and Danish fashion designer Erik Mortensen and sculptor Robert Jacobsen who both lived and worked in France.

The administration of the building was transferred from the prime minister's office to the Ministry of Cultural Affairs in 1961. In 1986 the facility came under the Ministry of Foreign Affairs as represented by the Danish Embassy located only two blocks away.

In 1997 it was proposed to sell the house due to problems with its financing but this was met with strong criticism with prominent users and collaborators and was ultimately rejected. Instead it was decided to relaunch the house as a self-owning institution managed according to commercial principles as well as to put it through a major refurbishment.

The refurbished House of Denmark was re-inaugurated in February 2002 it the presence of Queen Margrethe II and Henrik, Prince Consort of Denmark as well as the mayor of Paris Bertrand Delanoë.

== Building and green space ==
The renovation of the house involved a reconstruction of the front of the building, refurbishing the individual floors, renovation of la salle du Danemark, renovation of the green areas in the courtyard, design and construction of new terraces as well as a stairway connecting the terraces and integration of soft landscaping in the courtyard’s architecture.

The house is furnished with a combination of classical and contemporary Danish design by designers such as Arne Jacobsen, Poul Kjærholm, Poul Henningsen, Nanna Ditzel, and younger proponents Hans Sandgren Jakobsen and Boje Estermann.

== Current use and financing ==
Now a self-owning institution, the operations are financed through the renting out of four of the seven floors to international companies. The Salle du Danemark, a multipurpose cultural space on the second floor, is still used for its original purpose but rented out for commercial activities such as conferences and meetings when no activities are scheduled. The latter include a broad array of events related to Danish culture and commerce, including art exhibitions, jazz concerts, French-Danish film screenings, an exhibition on Danish bicycle culture, Danish product launches and political debates. Bang & Olufsen has a showroom in the ground floor of the building.

The building houses two restaurants. Restaurant Flora Danica is located on the ground floor and has outdoor service in the courtyard garden. Restaurant CPG (Copenhague until the renovation) is located on the first floor.

== See also ==
- List of foreign cultural institutes in Paris
