= Villa Troyon =

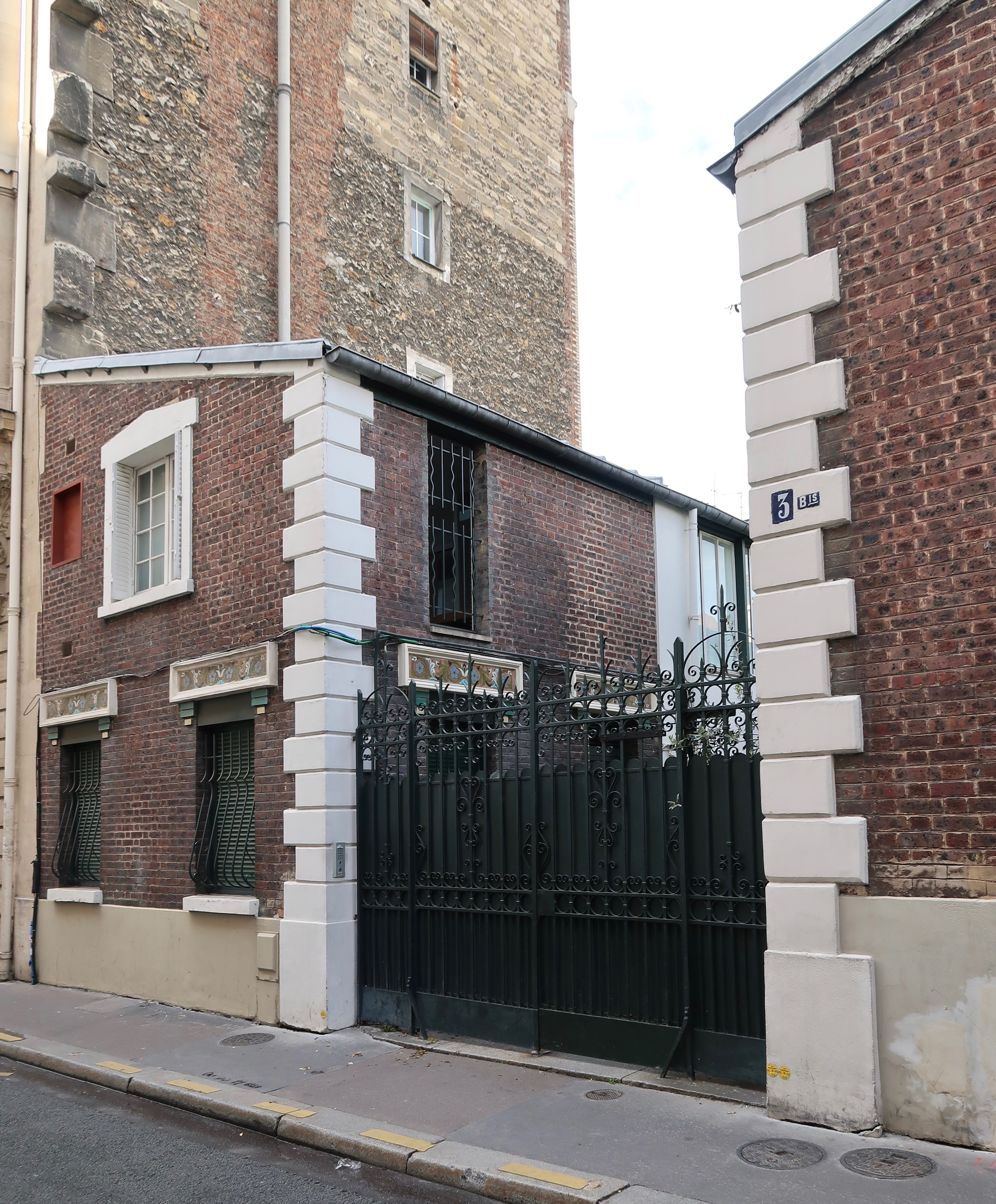
- Entrance to the Villa Troyon

General information
- Status: All original buildings remain standing
- Type: Artists' studio complex
- Architectural style: 19th-century Parisian courtyard ateliers
- Location: 3–7 rue Jean-Ferrandi (formerly rue de Bagneux), Paris, France
- Opened: Late 19th century
- Known for: Artists’ studios; residents including Diego Rivera, Moïse Kisling, and members of the Loysel family

The Villa Troyon is a complex of late-19th- and early-20th-century sculpture and painting studios built at 3-7 rue de Bagneux (today rue Jean-Ferrandi) in the 6th arrondissement of Paris.

Situated along a series of narrow passages near rue de Vaugirard and constructed from bricks and timber, the complex was founded by the Loysel family. It was later associated with artist residents including Diego Rivera, Moïse Kisling, Augusta Savage, Juana Muller, Augustus Saint-Gaudens, and Bolesłas Biegas.

== Origins and Name ==
The Villa Troyon was part of a proliferation of cités d’artistes that emerged on Paris's Left Bank in the late 19th and early 20th centuries, built to provide affordable, purpose-designed studios for the growing community of professional and aspiring artists associated with the nearby École des Beaux-Arts.

Other notable examples include La Ruche in Montparnasse; Cité Falguière in the 15ᵉ arrondissement, and Cité Fleurie in the 13ᵉ arrondissement.

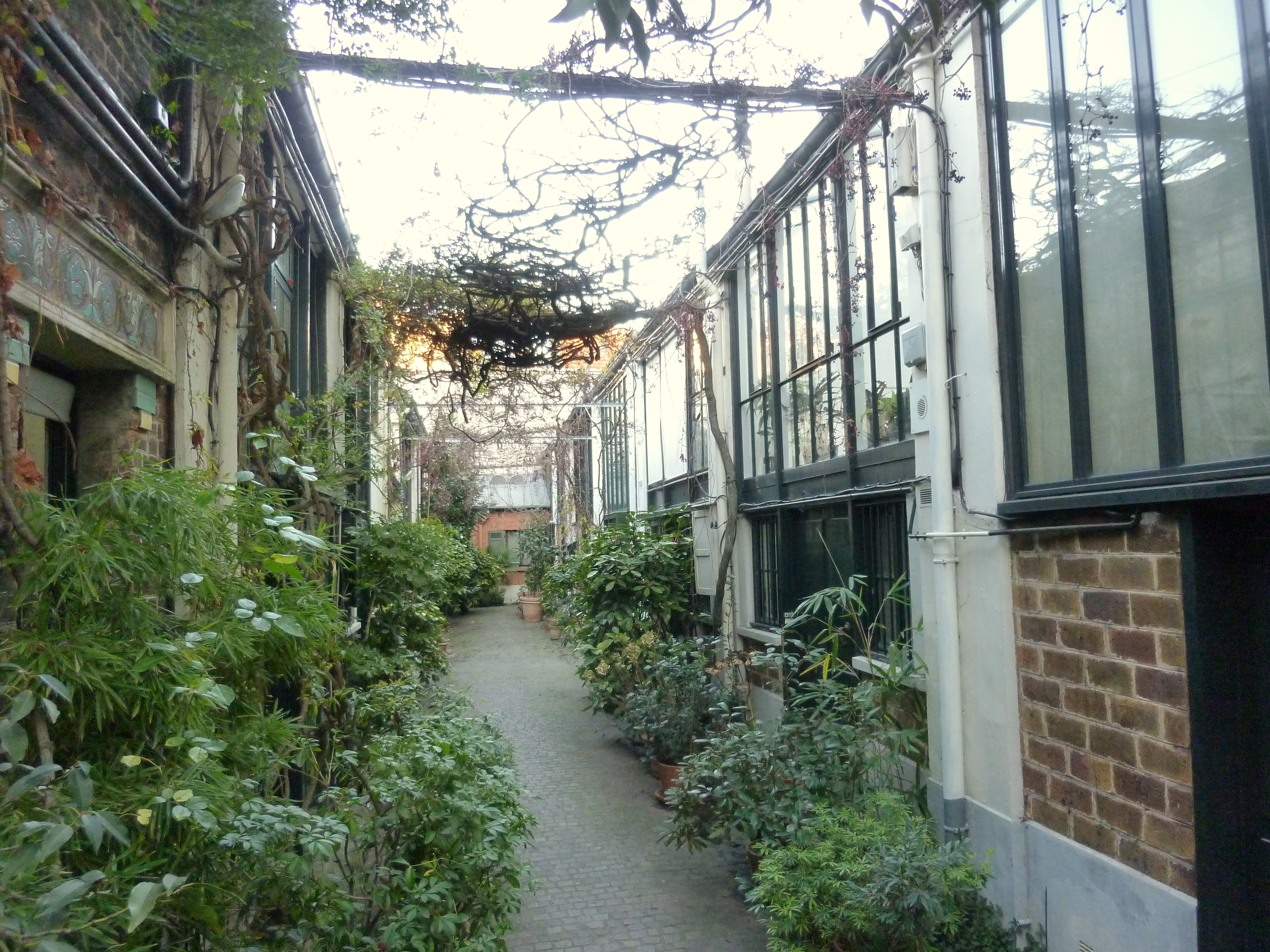
Inside the Villa Troyon

The Villa Troyon was founded by Léon-Félix Loysel (1825-1899), a painter trained under Barbizon School artists Théodore Rousseau and Constant Troyon, and his sons René Loysel (1861-1932), architect, and Jacques Loysel (1867-1925).

A reporter for The Art Amateur, described the complex in 1899 as "[s]everal rows of brick studios, overgrown with vines and separated from one another by narrow courts".

Contemporary notices from this time refer to the new studio buildings as Villa Troyon, honouring Léon-Félix Loysel's teacher Constant Troyon. This name continued to be used into the 20th century, though it is also referred to by its street name and numbers.

== Notable Artists ==
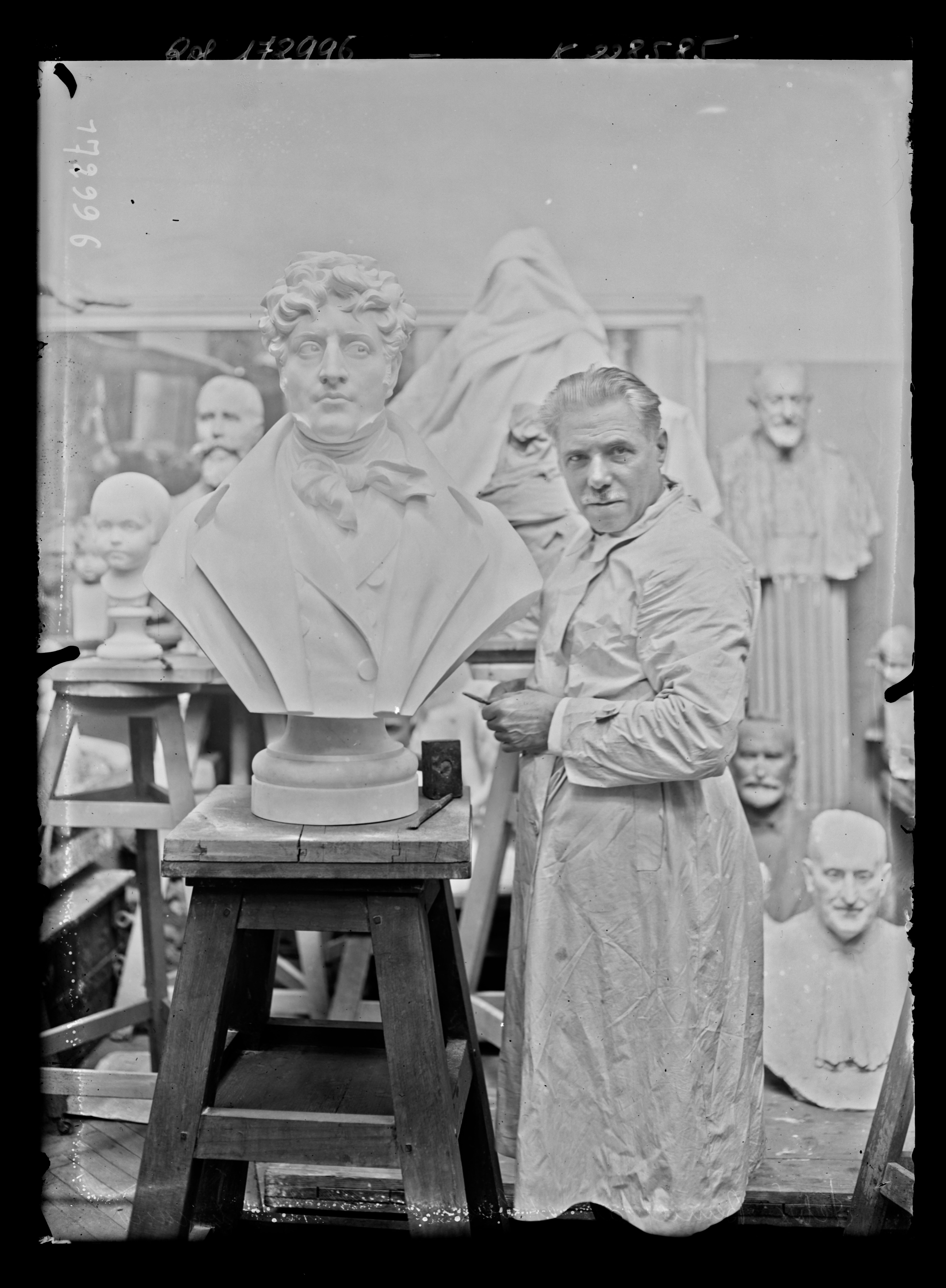
Félix Benneteau in his studio in Villa Troyon, 5, rue de Bagneux

The Villa Troyon's studios were used by a number of significant artists. The earliest were French academic painters and sculptors trained at the École des Beaux-Arts, including Charles Monginot (1825-1900), Paul Auban (1869-1945), and Alfred Félix Desruelles (1865-1943).

American sculptor and engraver, Augustus Saint-Gaudens, rented a workshop at the plot in the late 1890s, describing it as, “a charming little garden-like passage in the Rue de Bagneux, of which there are so many in out-of-the-way corners of Paris, the mere existence of which makes life worth living”. In his memoir, Saint-Gaudens recorded visits from the artist James McNeill Whistler.

German sculptor Richard Engelmann, recalled working at the Villa Troyon under the guidance of sculptor Jean Dampt, and notes that a "Swedish artist, Albert von Stockenström, also worked in the studio complex. He was highly talented, but addicted to absinthe. A bohemian in the truest sense of the word."

Diego Rivera’s first studio in Paris was located at Villa Troyon, and records suggest he moved between studios within the property around 1910. At this time, Moïse Kisling also lived at the address.

Beginning in 1929, Harlem Renaissance sculptor Augusta Savage, worked at the Villa Troyon under Félix Benneteau.

Other figures working at the studio complex include Polish sculptor Bolesłas Biegas, American opera singer Louise Homer, Chilean sculptor Juana Müller, American painter Helen Haas, and French sculptors André Bizette-Lindet and Alfred Janniot
