= Adam Mickiewicz Museum, Paris =

Museum in France

Coordinates: 48°51′4.5″N 2°21′20.5″E

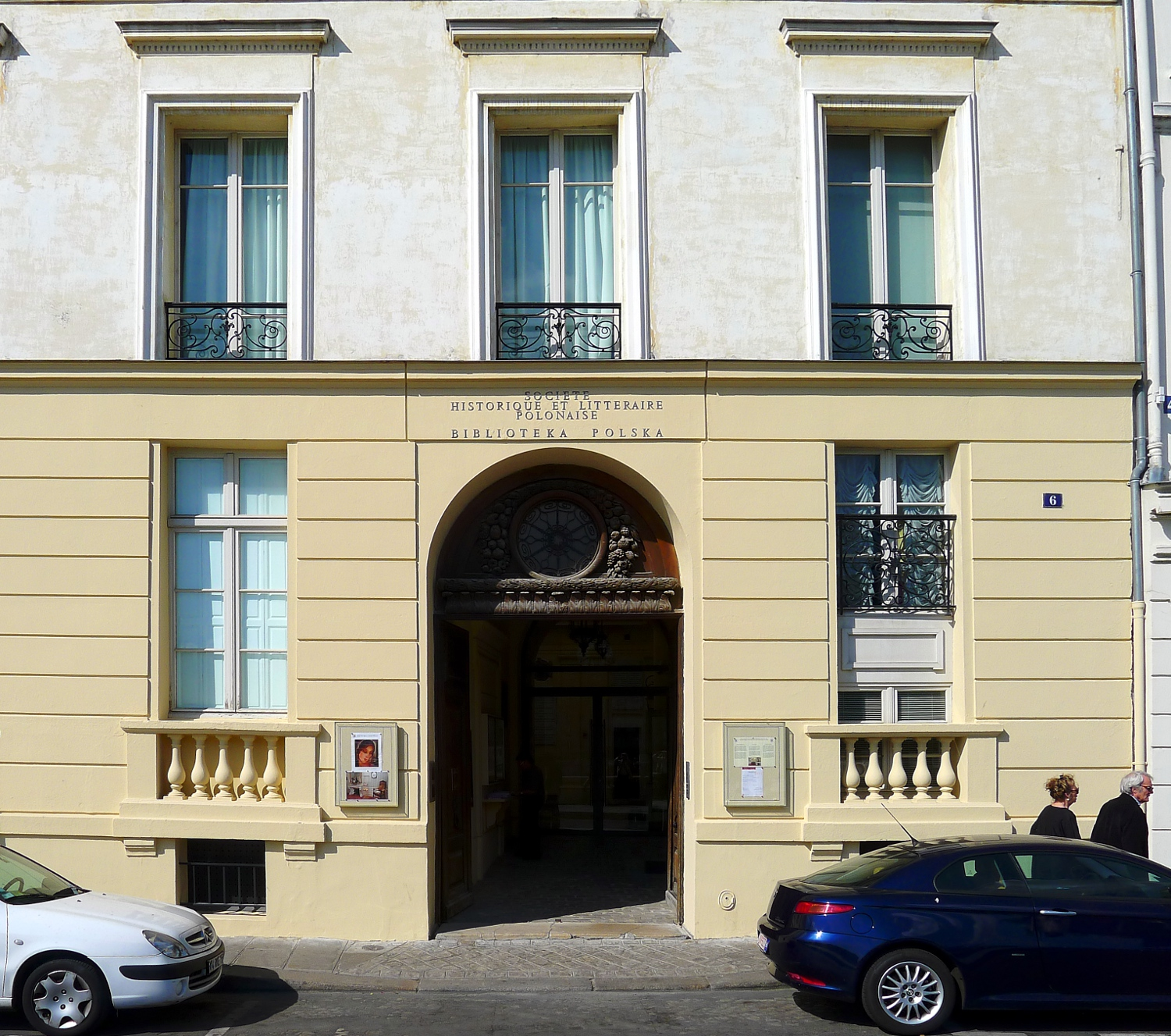
Seat of the Adam Mickiewicz Museum in Paris

The Adam Mickiewicz Museum (in French: Musée Adam Mickiewicz) is a small museum dedicated to Polish poet Adam Mickiewicz (1798–1855). It is located within the Polish Library in Paris in the 4th arrondissement of Paris at 6, Quai d'Orleans, Paris, France.

The museum was established in 1930, and contains numerous personal effects as well as an archive including many autograph items. It occupies one room in the Bibliothèque Polonaise à Paris, which also houses the Musée Boleslas Biegas and the Salon Frédéric Chopin.

Guided visits are available Thursday afternoons and Saturday mornings by prior appointment; an admission fee is charged.

== See also ==
- List of museums in Paris

== Bibliography ==
- Paris Visites, Petit Futé, 2007, page 27. ISBN 2-7469-1885-4..
