= Chapelle dorée, Paris =

Chapelle dorée of the church of Saint-Gervais-Saint-Protais
- Chapelle doree, Paris
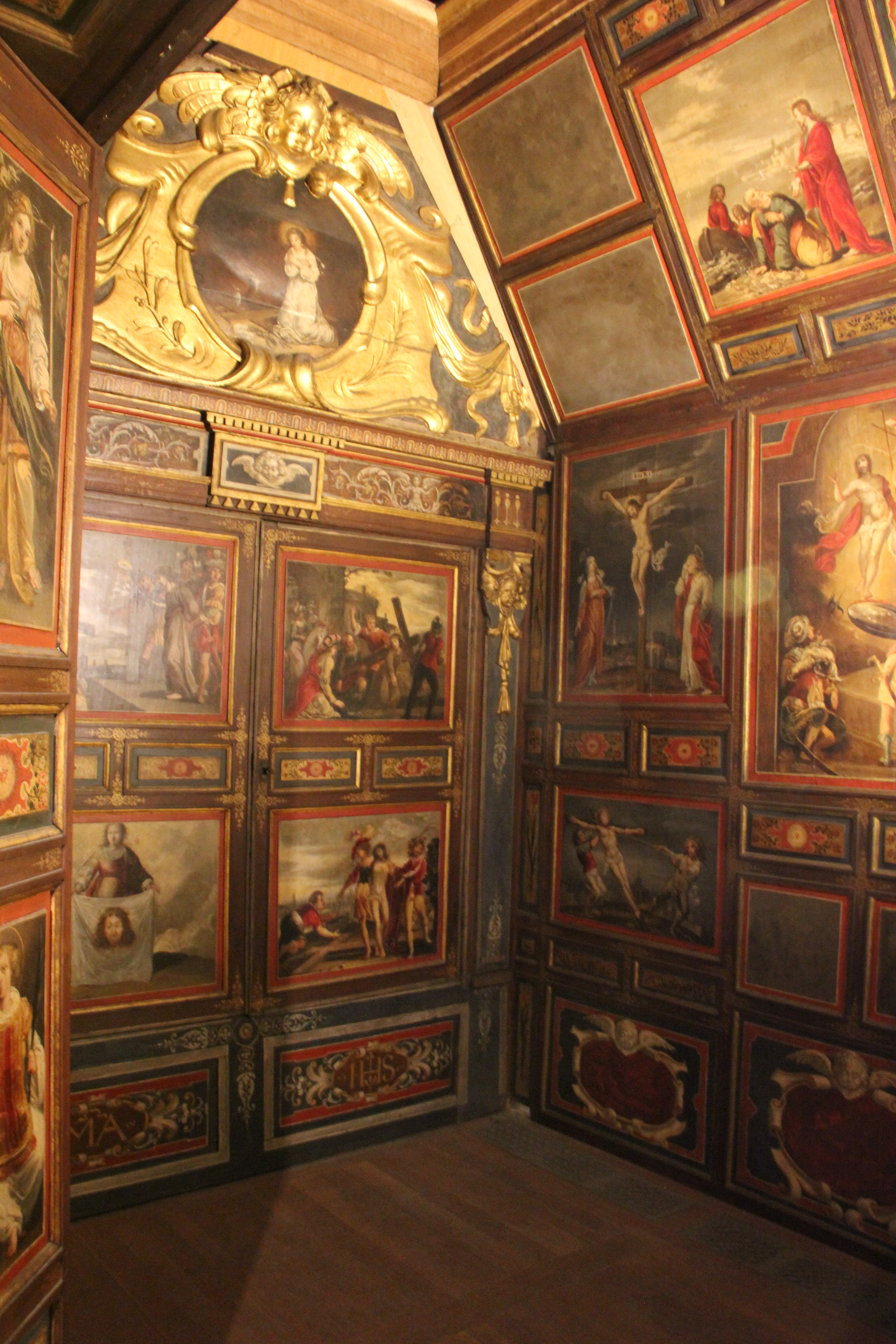
- Chapelle dorée of the Saint-Gervais-Saint-Protais
- Chapelle dorée of the church of Saint-Gervais-Saint-Protais
- 48°51′20″N 2°21′16″E
- Location: 3th arrondissement of Paris
- Country: France
- Denomination: Roman Catholic Church

Architecture
- Style: Louis XIIIth

The Chapelle dorée is a Roman Catholic chapel located within the church of Saint-Gervais-Saint-Protais on Place Saint-Gervais in the Marais district of the 4th arrondissement of Paris. Created between 1628 and 1634, it is one of the smallest but also one of the most lavishly decorated chapels in Paris. It is entirely covered with paintings, gilded and painted woodwork in the Louis XIII style. It is only open on special occasions or by advance arrangement with the church.

== History ==
In 1627 Antoine Goussault, a counselor of the Parliament and high official at the Royal Palace, asked for permission to build a tomb below ground and a small funeral chapel above it entering directly into the church. As agreement was made and Goussalt paid one thousand livres and an annual fee of thirty sols. He died and was entombed there in 1634. The chapel and tomb below it remained in the family until 1680, when they were sold by his widow to Louis Betuld. The walls were entirely filled with paintings and other decoration. It remained in the family with very few changes. The chapel was restored in 1825, 1930, and 2000.

== Description ==
The chapel is very small, just eight meters by four meters, and has no windows. It is composed of a vesibule with two parts opening onto a narrow nave in the form of a rectangle, with a trapezoidal vault with caissons imitating the architecture of ancient tombs. All of the surface is covered with lambris, paintings, and other decoration. An altar is placed at the east end.

== Gallery ==
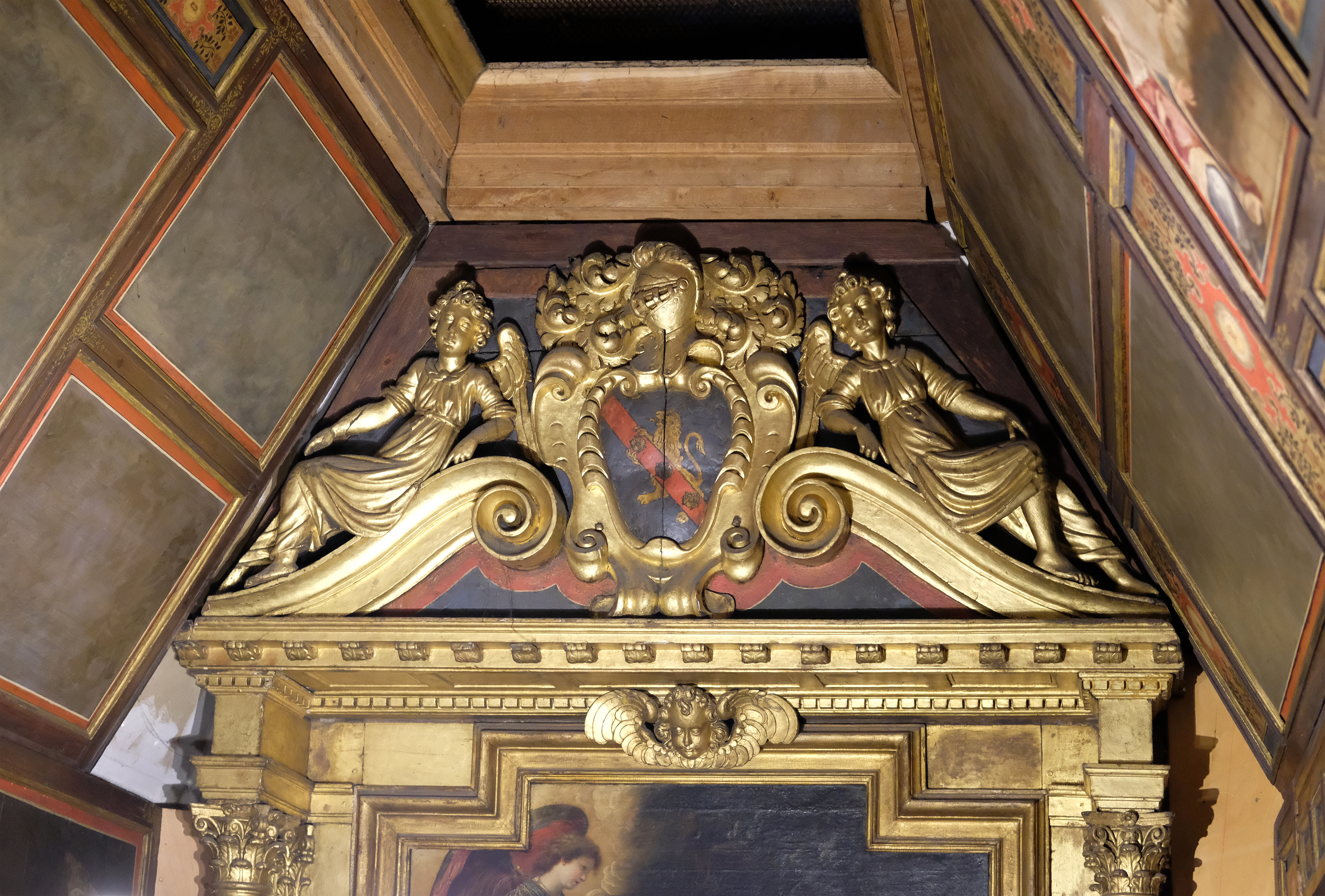
Entry with coat of arms of the family

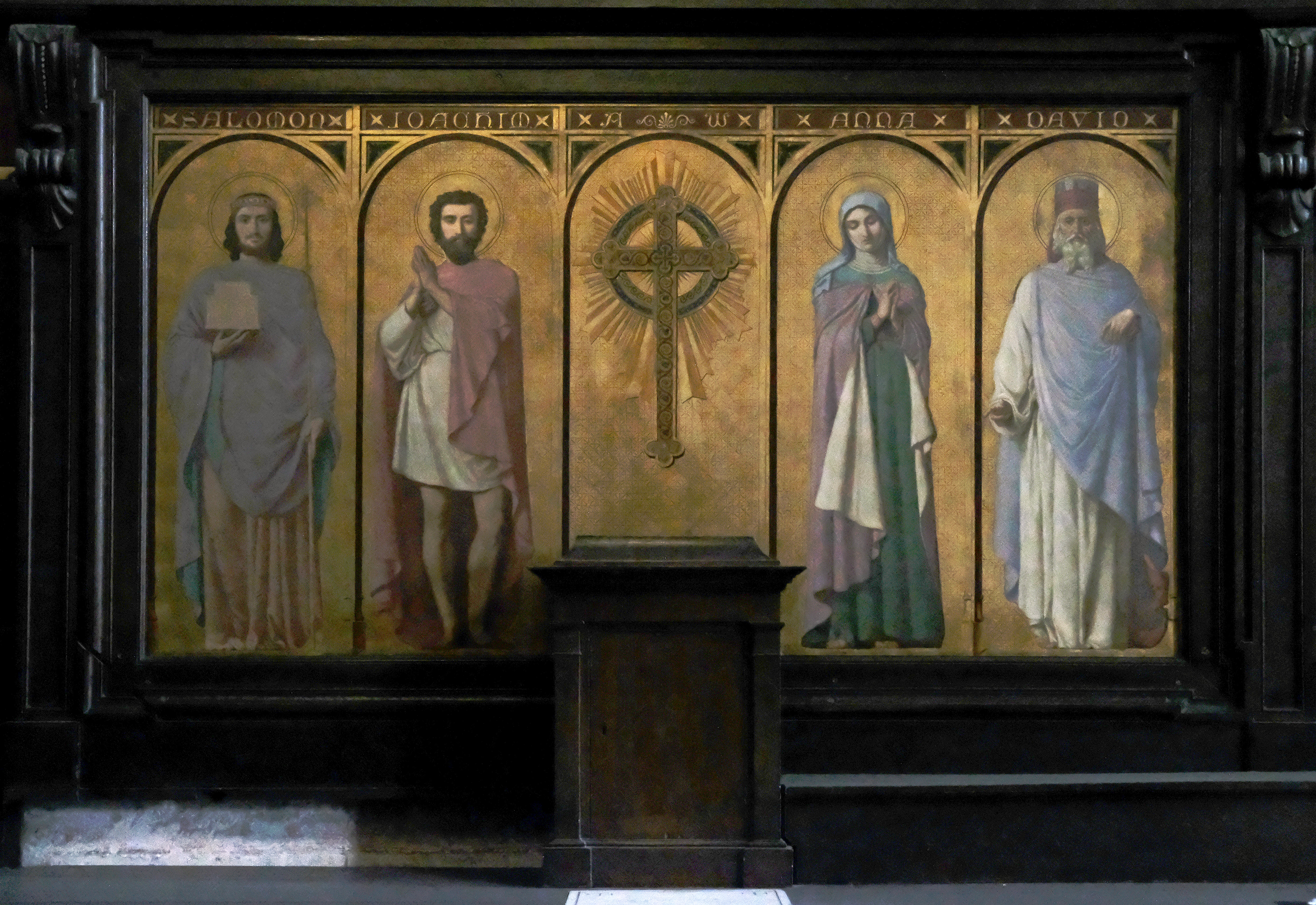
The altar

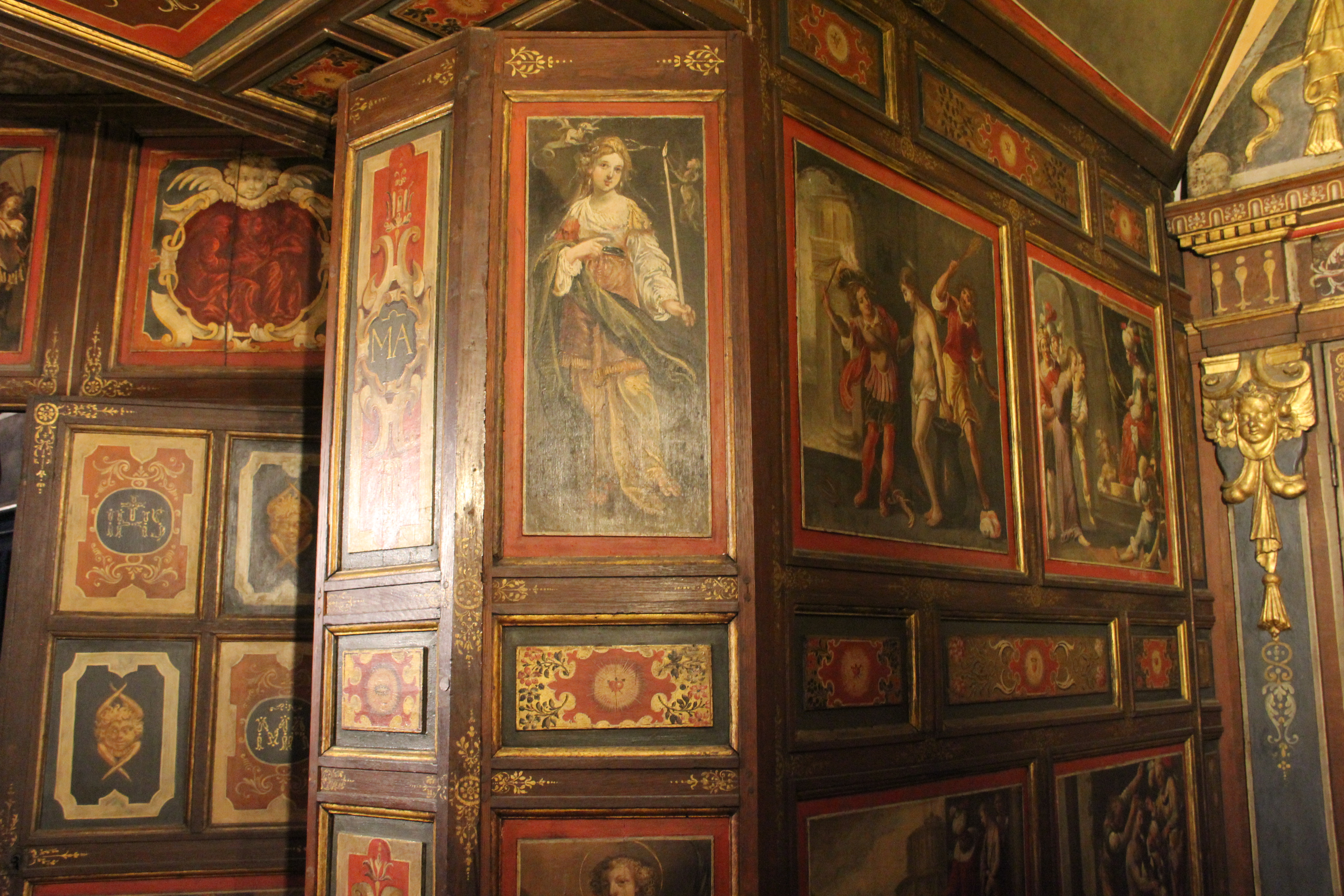
Interior

== Art and decoration ==
The walls of the tiny chapel are entirely filled with art and decoration. These include twenty-one paintings of scenes the Passion and the Resurrection of Christ,

The art and decoration reflects the theology of the aristocracy in Paris in the 18th century. The painting over thee altar, by Claude Vignon, depicts Christ on the Mount of Olives. The symbol of the Sacred Heart, with the heart, three nails and a laurel wreath, appears three times. Other art in the chapel depicts, an evangelist, a Saint with the first name of a family member, and Cherubs with ornamental motifs.
