= The Polish Prometheus =

Painting by Horace Vernet

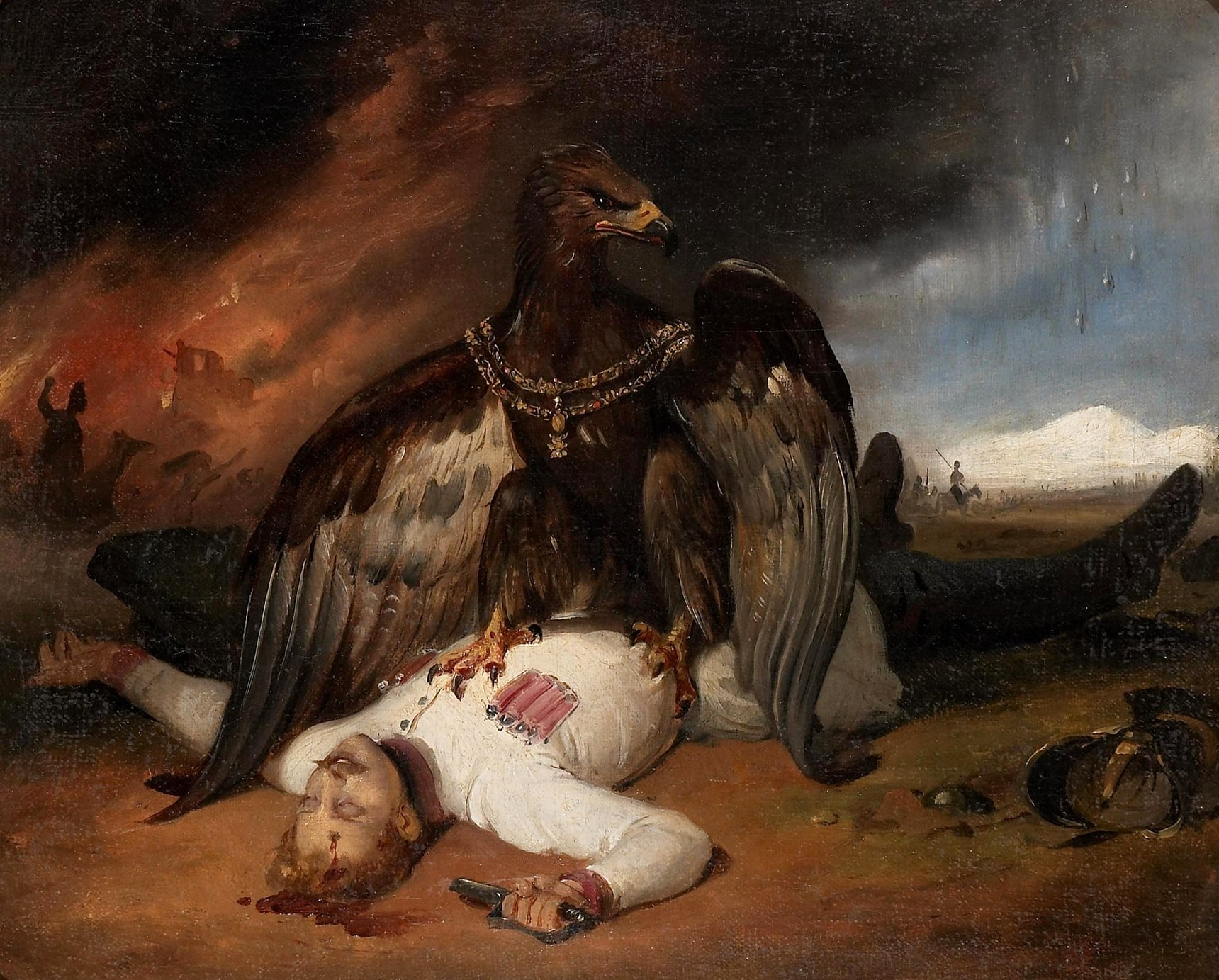
- Artist: Horace Vernet
- Year: 1831
- Type: Oil on canvas
- Dimensions: 35 cm × 45 cm (14 in × 18 in)
- Location: Polish Library in Paris, Paris

The Polish Prometheus or Allegory of Defeated Poland is an oil on canvas painting by Horace Vernet, from 1831, inspired by Poland's recent failed November Uprising against the Russian Empire. The ancient Greek character Prometheus played a major part in the quest for emancipation in Polish literature and art, particularly given his eventual liberation by Heracles.

The painting shows a dead and bleeding Polish soldier in a white uniform with a sabre. On his chest rests an enormous black eagle (symbol of Russia) wearing the Order of Saint Andrew, whilst in the background are a woman fleeing a Russian cavalryman (left) and sketches of Polish soldiers (right). The painter was close to the liberal French circles who supported the Uprising. In 1950, Louise de Saint-Maurice gave the work to the Polish Library in Paris, where it still hangs.
