= Bolesław Biegas =

Polish painter and sculptor

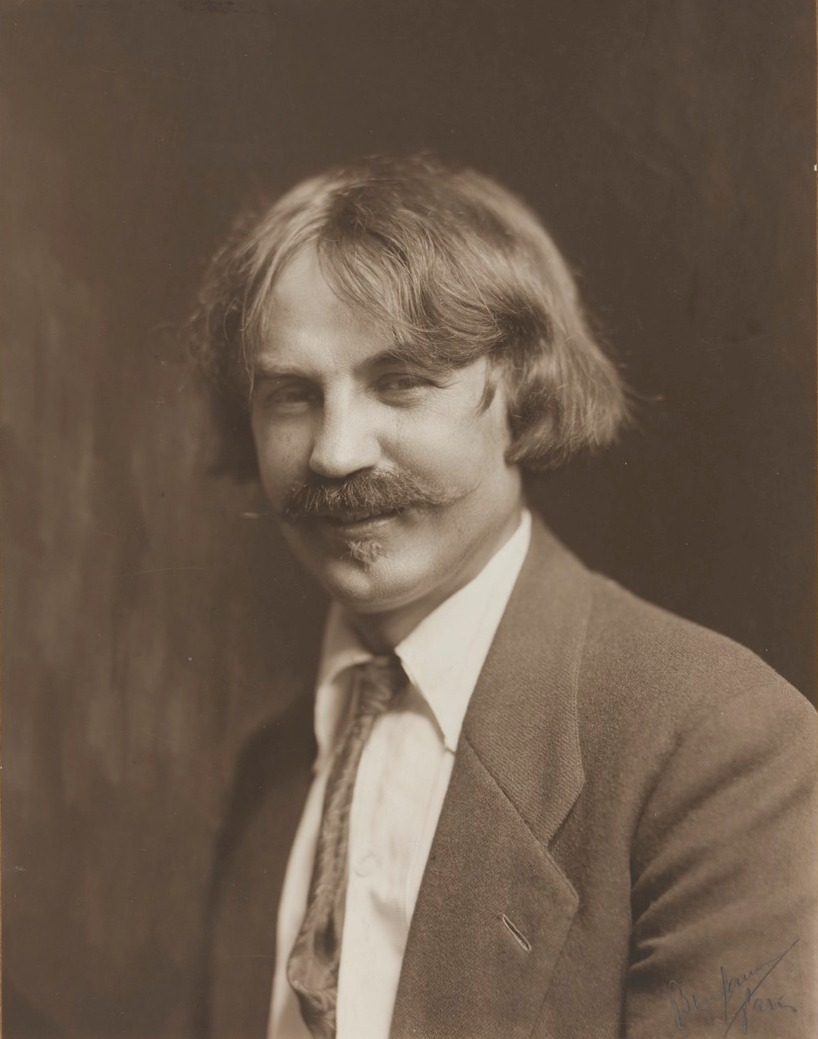
Bolesław Biegas, 1923

Bolesław Biegas (1877–1954) was a Polish surrealist and Symbolist painter and sculptor.

== Biography ==
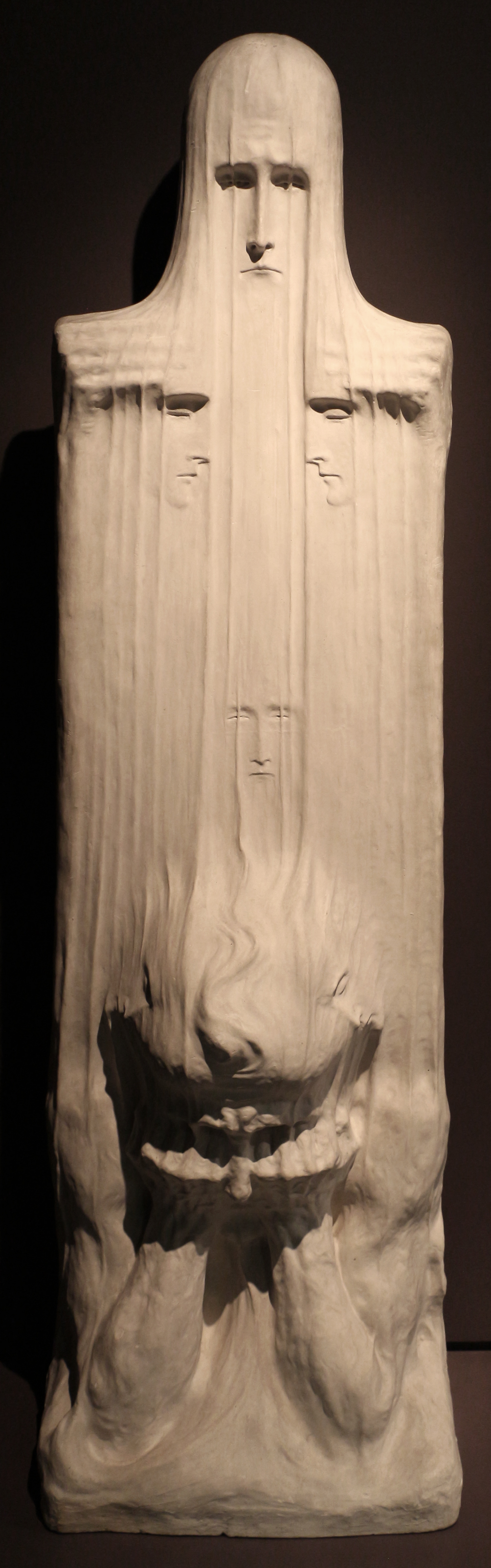
Boleslas biegas, la nostalgia del povero, 1905 ca. 01

Biegas was born in Koziczyn, Poland and orphaned at a young age. He began studying sculpture in Warsaw in the studio of a local sculptor, Antoni Panasiuk, then studied art under Konstanty Laszczka at the Jan Matejko Academy of Fine Arts in Kraków. After being expelled for his sculpture The Book of Life, Biegas moved permanently to Paris, where he briefly attended the École des Beaux-Arts before beginning his independent artistic activity.

From 1900, his works were exhibited in several Salons, including the parisian Galerie des Artistes Modernes and Galerie Arts et Artistes Anglais, and galleries in London, St. Petersburg and Kiev.

Biegas also created a series of Symbolist style paintings, featuring mythical, monstrous and female chimeras, which symbolised a violent battle of the sexes.

In Paris, Biegas had his studio at the Villa Troyon at 3 bis, rue de Bagneux.

Biegas established a small museum for his art in 1950, in Paris, France, called the Musée Boleslas Biegas. It is located within the Polish Library in Paris in the 4th arrondissement of Paris at 6, Quai d'Orléans.

The museum contains his own paintings and sculpture, as well as other Polish artists active from the end of the nineteenth century to the beginning of the twentieth century, including Olga Boznańska and Tadeusz Makowski. The museum occupies one room in the Polish Library in Paris, which also houses the Musée Adam Mickiewicz and the Salon Frédéric Chopin.

== See also ==
- List of museums in Paris
- Symbolists
- Fin-de-siecle
