= Polish Library in Paris =

Polish cultural centre in France

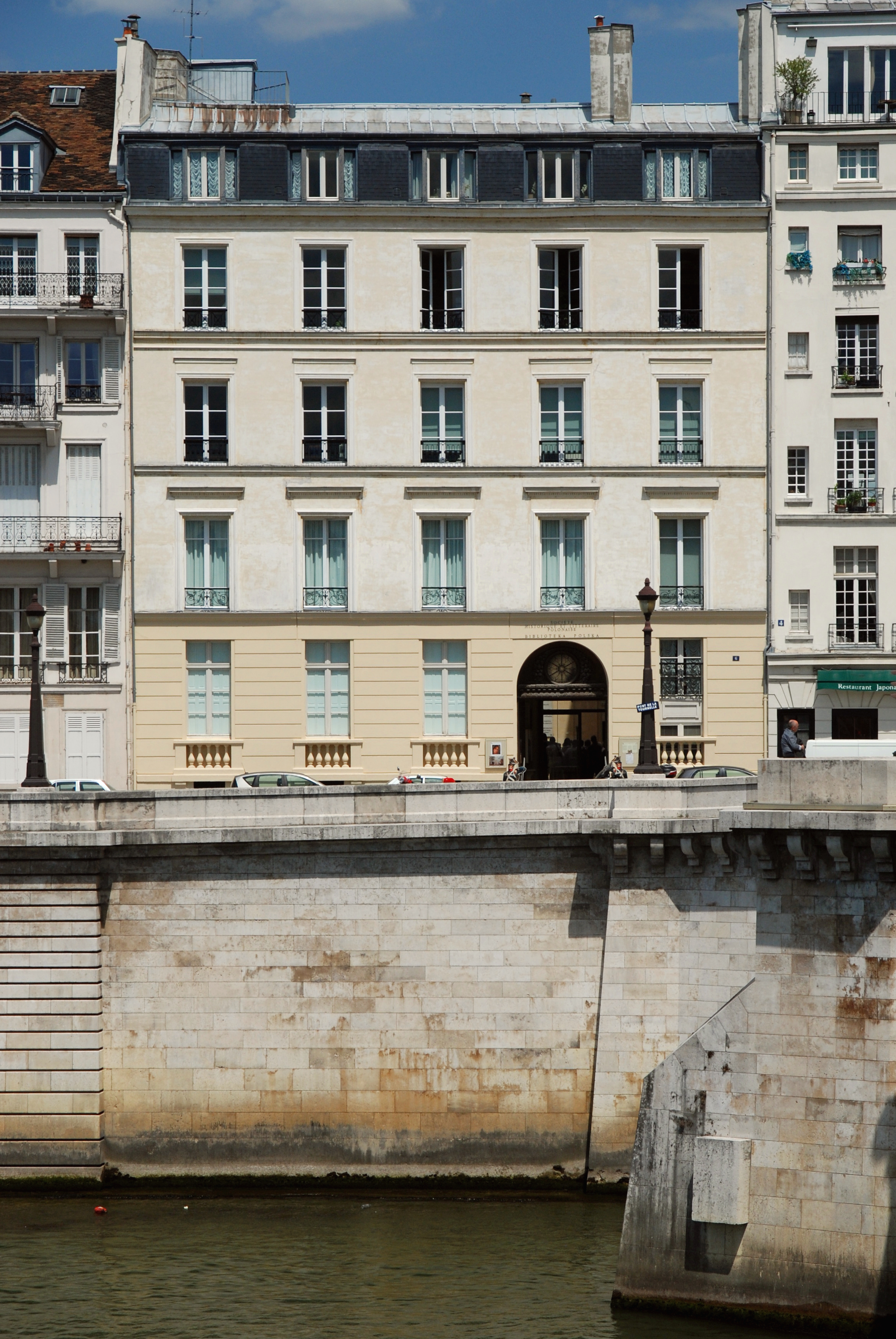
- Entrance to the Polish Library in Paris
- Formation: 1838
- Type: 19th and 20th-century Polish documentary collections abroad and Mickiewicz and Chopin Museums
- Location: 8, Quai d'Orleans, Ile Saint-Louis
- Coordinates: 48°51′0″N 2°21′35″E
- Library Association Chairman: C. Pierre Zaleski
- Library Director: C. Pierre Zaleski
- Museum Head: A. Czarnocka
- Head of Manuscripts and Archives: Ewa Rutkowska
- Website: www.bibliotheque-polonaise-paris-shlp.fr

The Polish Library in Paris (French: Bibliothèque Polonaise de Paris, Polish: Biblioteka Polska w Paryżu) is a Polish cultural centre of national importance and is closely associated both with the historic Great Emigration of the Polish élite to Paris in the 19th century and the formation in 1832 of the Literary Society (Towarzystwo Literackie), later the Historical and Literary Society.

The Library was founded in 1838 by Adam Jerzy Czartoryski, Julian Ursyn Niemcewicz, Karol Sienkiewicz, and others. Its first task was to safeguard all surviving books, documents, archives, and treasures of national importance to Poland. It has become a historical and documentary resource open for use by Poles and other researchers and visitors.

The Library houses three museums related to significant Polish artists: the Salon Frédéric Chopin, the Adam Mickiewicz Museum, and the Bolesław Biegas Art collection. UNESCO's Memory of the World Register rates it an institution unique of its kind.

== History ==
The prime instigator for the creation of the Polish Library in Paris was Karol Sienkiewicz, who had managed to assemble the already existing book collections in the history and statistical departments of the Towarzystwo Literackie w Paryżu, and the Towarzystwo Pomocy Naukowej, the Polish Literary and Scientific Aid societies.

A critical role in the venture was played by the French Société de Civilisation, which, spurred on by the effect Adam Mickiewicz had with his article, "Rabunek bibliotek i muzeów w Polsce"—the pillage of libraries and museums in Poland—started a public appeal to garner support for a library dedicated to Poland. The act of foundation was signed in November 1838, followed in March 1839 by a gala opening of the building. A library committee consisting of eight delegates took on the running of the enterprise. Prince Czartoryski was elected as its life president, while the functions of secretary, librarian and treasurer were entrusted to Sienkiewicz.

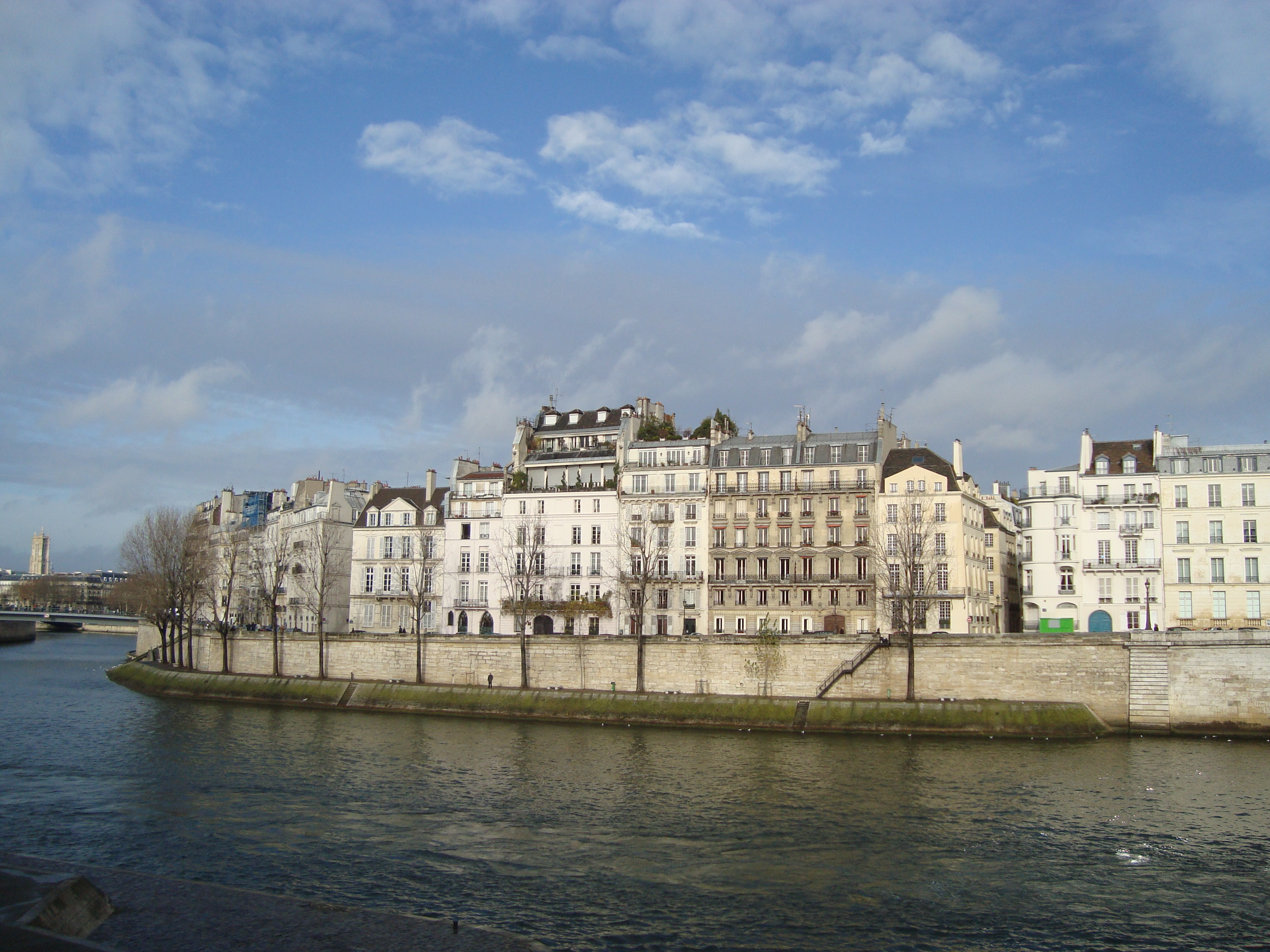
Quai d'Orléans (the first building on the right houses the Polish Library)

To satisfy French legal requirements, Czartoryski took on formal ownership of the institution, thus securing its material survival. The initial plan was to erect a purpose-built Polish mansion in Paris to house the collections, but the shortage of funds led to the abandonment of that ambition, and instead a 17th-century four storey mansion was bought, on the Ile Saint-Louis along the Quai d'Orleans. The library moved into eleven rooms on the second floor while the rest of the building was let as accommodation to finance the loans that had been taken out.

Meanwhile, the Library saw rapid expansion as gifts and legacies arrived from private individuals, for instance the collections of Małachowski, Julian Ursyn Niemcewicz, Karol Kniaziewicz and Adam Mickiewicz. By 1845 the Library held 15,000 volumes and three years later, almost 20,000 items. In 1914 the collection contained 100,000 books. In addition, there was a stock of journals and reviews, of photographs, and of medals and coins.

Towards the end of the 19th century, the activities of the Literary Society had declined, and the maintenance of the library in Paris was transferred in 1893 to the responsibility of the Polish Academy of Sciences and Letters in Kraków. in 1926, Władysław Mickiewicz (son of Adam) bequeathed his important collection of manuscripts to the library. In the following period, a number of valuable books, manuscripts and artworks which the library could not properly maintain were sent to museums and institutions in the now independent Poland.

=== World War II and after ===
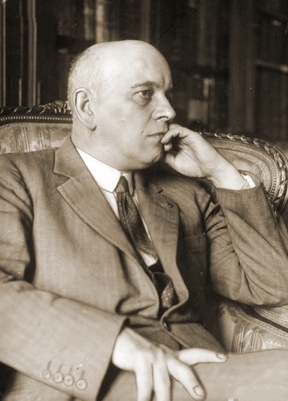
Franciszek Jan Pułaski, director of the Polish Library, 1928–56

On the eve of World War II there were 145,000 books, 1,000 manuscripts, 12,000 images, 2,800 atlases and maps and 20,000 copies of documents relating to Polish history drawn from British and French archives. Though German occupying forces seized the library's collection during World War II, the Library was able to resume work with the liberation of Paris.

Most of the looted materials were returned from Germany by 1947, however, the Library faced bitter legal battles with the post-war Communist Polish government over ownership. These were eventually resolved in the Library's favour in 1959.

Following Poland's return to democracy in 1989, links were re-established with the new Polish government. Vernet's The Polish Prometheus was also donated to the Library in 1950.

== Current dilemmas ==
The Polish Library in Paris is the oldest cultural institution outside the territory of Poland. Since 1854 the Library has occupied the entire original building. Next to the Library are the premises of the Adam Mickiewicz Museum, Paris, opened in 1903. Attached, are also the Salon Frédéric Chopin, the only permanent exhibition in Paris to the memory of the composer, and the Musée Boleslas Biegas with paintings and sculptures by the artist and other Polish artists.

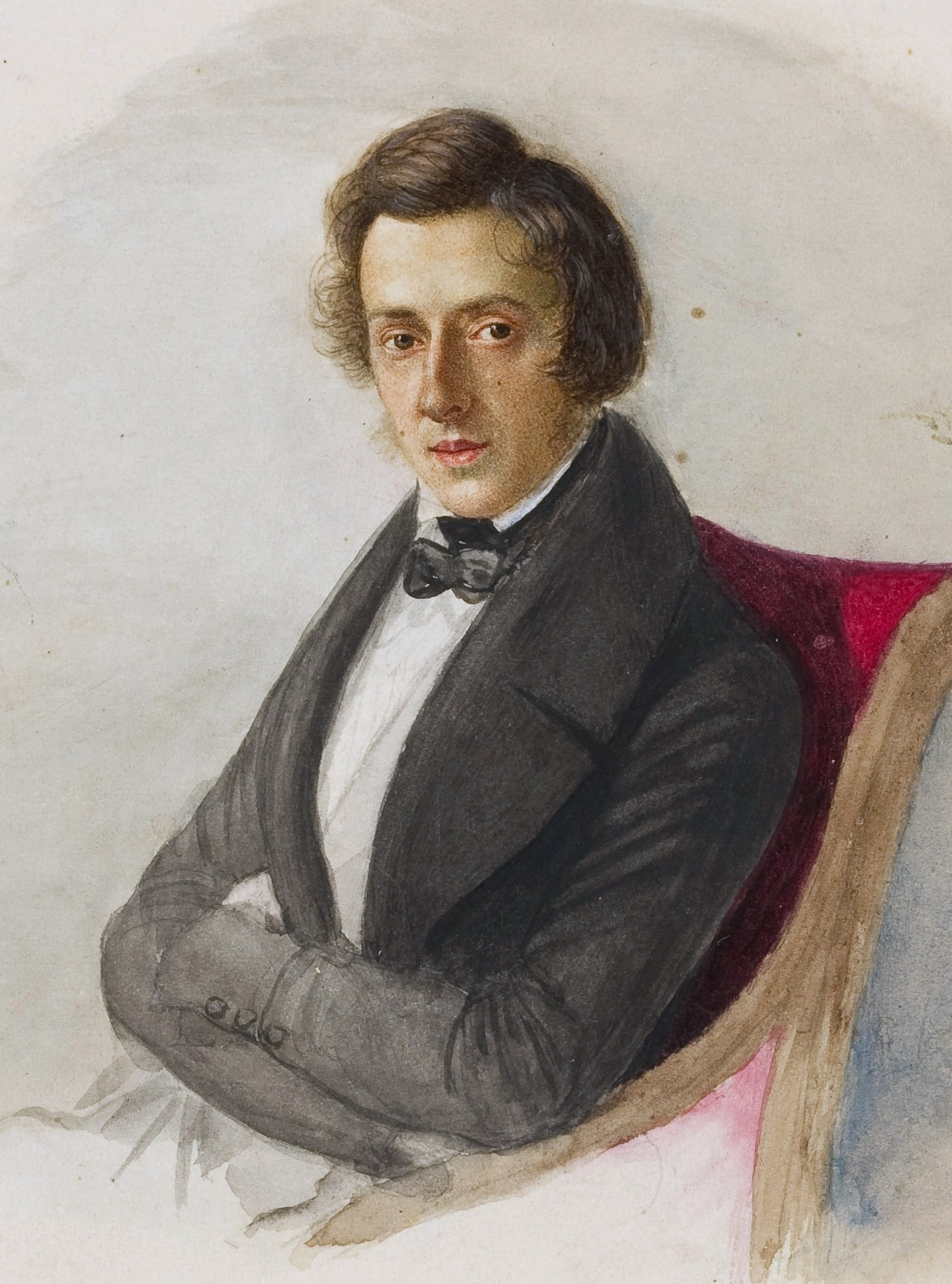
Chopin, by his fiancée Maria Wodzińska, 1835

In 1989 the collection had grown to 220,000 volumes, around 5,000 Polish maps, 7,000 16th–20th century images, plus the collections of the Towarzystwo Historyczno-Literackie w Paryżu.

Though in 1893 the Library came under the predecessor of the Polish Academy of Learning in Kraków, at that time in partitioned Poland, this did not resolve its relationship with the Library's neighbour and founding institution in Paris, the Historical and Literary Society (the Société Historique et Littéraire Polonaise, SHLP).

In 2004, after a process of arbitration, it was agreed that the Library would be co-owned by the two organisations, via an Association de la Bibliothèque Polonaise de Paris, effectively a governing council comprising seven delegates from each parent institution.

Typically, these are persons with distinguished academic credentials from France or Poland. The chairman of the association, or governing council of the Library, is elected for a term of 5 years and is currently C. Pierre Zaleski, of the Polish Academy of Learning. He is also the Library's chief executive and heads a professional management team for the Library's day-to-day running.

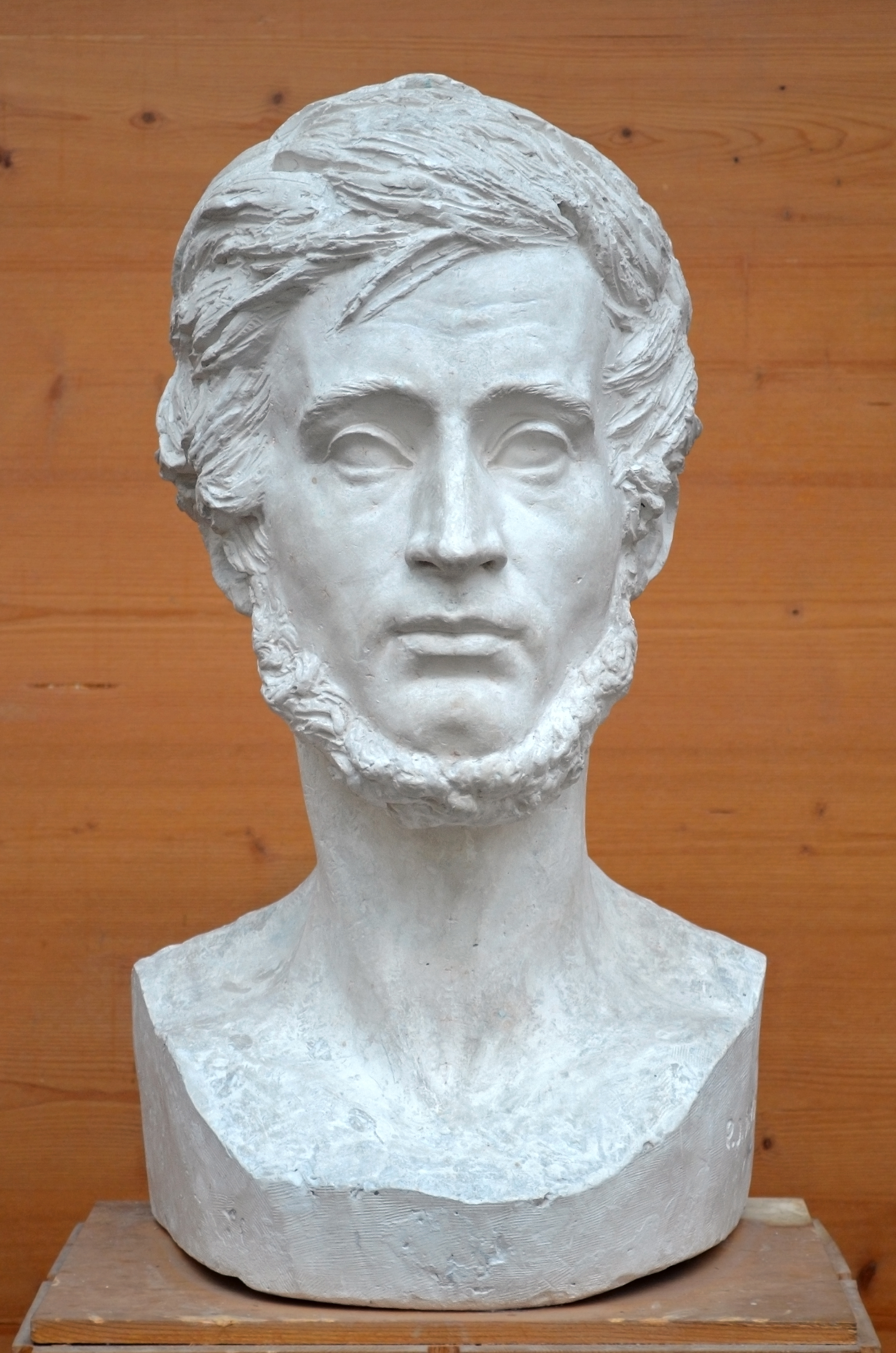
David d'Angers' Adam Mickiewicz, 1835

The Library and its co-owner, the Historical and Literary Society, are jointly members of the Standing Conference of [Polish] Museums, Archives and Libraries in the West[ern hemisphere]. This body groups all recognised collections outside Poland, but it does not cover items held in foreign institutions, nor the many thousands of objects as yet unrecovered from wartime looting and displacement.

In the present economic decline the Library, though partly funded from Poland's higher-education budget, faces continual challenges as maintenance costs rise, materials age, and cultural institutions face financial competition from other social priorities and needs, not least digital ones. There is currently pressure on the Polish collection at Rapperswil Castle in Switzerland to surrender its premises. This bodes ill for other such centres which may be obliged either to be scattered or receive more fragile materials, as has already disastrously happened in the case of the Polish Museum at Fawley Court, England.

== See also ==
- List of foreign cultural institutes in Paris
- List of museums in Paris
- Chateau de Montresor
- Rapperswil Castle
- Hotel Lambert
- Ossolineum
- Polish Institute and Sikorski Museum
- Polish Social and Cultural Centre
- Fawley Court
- List of libraries in France

== Bibliography ==
- Bieńkowska B.: Książka na przestrzeni dziejów, Warszawa 2005
- Pezda, Janusz: Historia biblioteki polskiej w Paryżu w latach 1838-1893, Historia Iagellonica, Kraków 2013, ISBN 978-83-62261-67-3
- Żukow-Karczewski Marek: Biblioteka przy Quai d'Orleans, "Życie Literackie", 2 IV 1989, nr 13 (1932)
