= Salon Frédéric Chopin =

Museum in France

Coordinates: 48.8513°N 2.3556°E

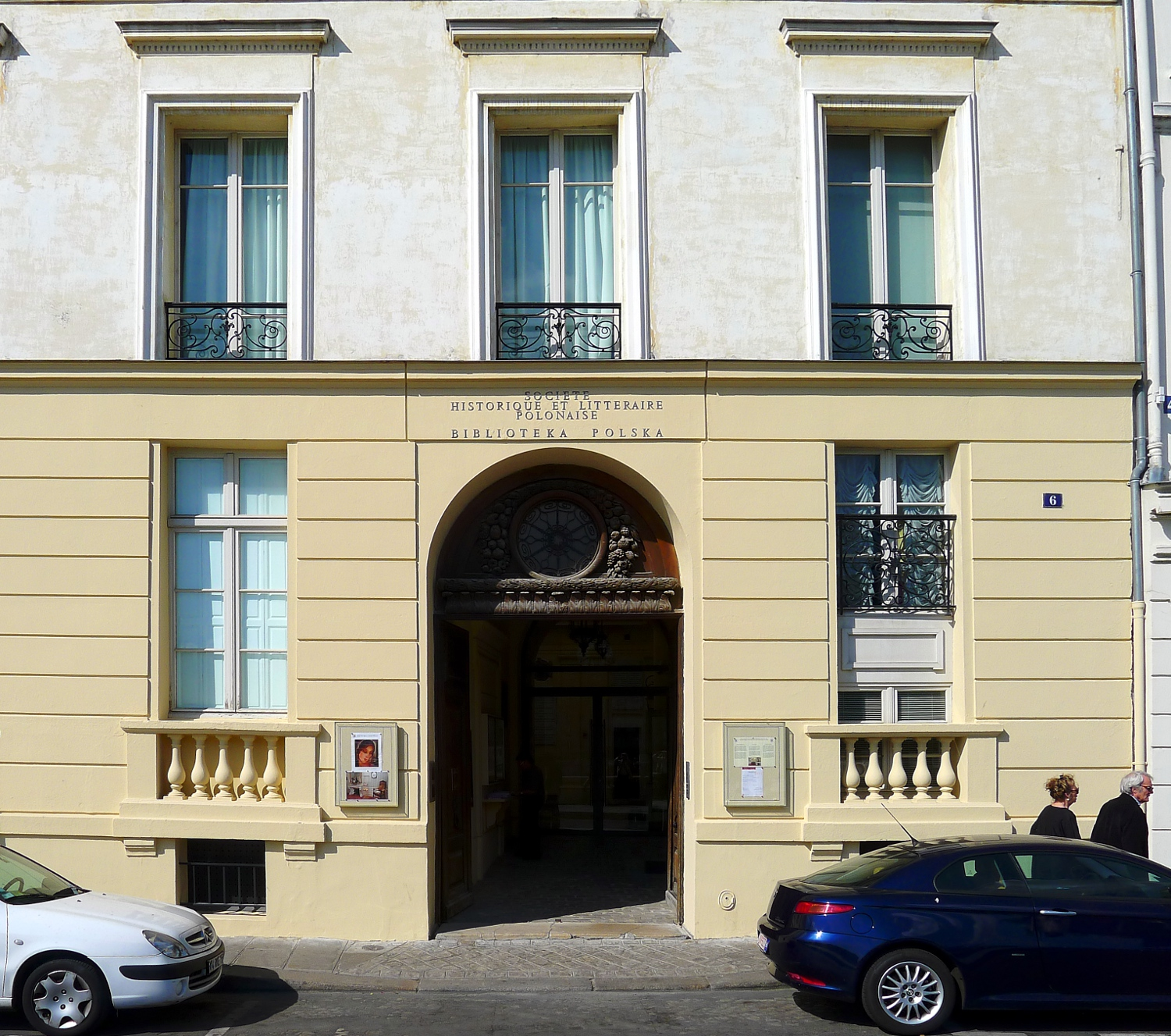
Quai d'Orléans n°6

The Salon Frédéric Chopin (French pronunciation: [salɔ̃ fʁedeʁik ʃɔpɛ̃]) is a small museum dedicated to Frédéric Chopin. It is located within the Polish Library in Paris—Bibliothèque polonaise de Paris—in the 4th arrondissement of Paris at 6, Quai d'Orléans, Paris, France. Guided visits are available Thursday afternoons and Saturday mornings by prior appointment; an admission fee is charged.

The museum contains a number of Chopin's mementos, including his death mask and a casting of his left hand by Auguste Clésinger, several paintings, numerous portraits, autographs, first editions, and his favorite chair. The museum occupies one room in the Bibliothèque Polonaise à Paris, which also houses the Musée Adam Mickiewicz and the Musée Boleslas Biegas.

== See also ==
- List of museums in Paris
- List of music museums
