= Didier Mumengi =

Congolese journalist

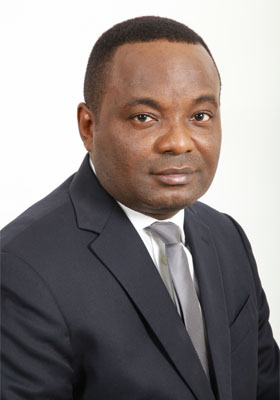
- Didier Mumengi Tshikudi

Chief of Staff at the Ministry of Information and the Press
- In office June 1998 – January 2001
- President: Laurent-Désiré Kabila

Chief of Staff at the Ministry of International Cooperation
- In office 1998–2001

Senator
- Incumbent
- Assumed office March 15, 2019
- President: Félix Tshisekedi
- Constituency: Kinshasa

Personal details
- Born: Didier Mumengi Tshikudi; May 23, 1962 Kinshasa, Democratic Republic of the Congo

Didier Mumengi was born in Kinshasa, May 23, 1962 (age 63). A self-taught historian and economist, journalist by training, trainer in management and education, he is a writer and politician. He began his journalistic career as a columnist in a college newspaper in Paris. Afterwards, he penned several articles in various French and Congolese journals, including "Le Monde diplomatique."

== Biography ==
In 1997, in the government of Laurent Désiré Kabila, he became Chief of Staff at the Ministry of Information and the Press. Starting in 1998, he was Chief of Staff at the Ministry of International Cooperation. In June 1998, he was named by then-president Laurent Désiré Kabila to a post as Minister of Information and the Press, as well as, spokesperson of the Government. He then combined the positions of Minister of Information and Minister of Tourism. In 2001, he became the Youth Minister.

In 1998, when American Secretary of State, Madeleine Albright dubbed the war in the Congo the African World War One, that is the invasion of the Democratic Republic of the Congo by the armies of Rwanda, Uganda and Burundi, Mumengi boldly represented the congolese resistance, in military fatigues (cfr. Jason K. Stearns, Dancing in the glory of Monsters, The Collapse of the Congo and the great war of Africa. In his book Guerre des Grands Lacs, La résistance congolaise, the professor and international functionary at UNESCO Joseph Poto Poto noted : "When peace is restored, the Congolese will most certainly remember this tragic episode of history. One name among many others will force that memory, that of Didier Mumengi" (page 49).

In June 2004, he started the movement Ligue du peuple, a gathering of political parties, NGOs and associations, to accompany his presidential candidacy.

Mumengi was a candidate in the July 2006, Presidential Election in the Democratic Republic of the Congo : he was not, however, in the final list of official candidates.

In 2002, Mumengi began his career as a trainer in Development at CADICEC (Centre Chrétien d'Action pour Dirigeants et Cadres d'Entreprise au Congo). In 2006, he created his tailor-made professional consultancy and training company, Temps 9 sarl. In 2008, he became chairman of the board of directors of the professional training center CADICEC.

In 2011, he was an evaluation consultant for the United Nations Evaluation Group at the United Nations Development Program, an expert in poverty and development.

March 15, 2019, he was elected Senator for the City of Kinshasa.

== Private life ==
He married Angèle Baende B. Mumengi in 1992. Didier Mumengi is the father of four children.

== Works ==
- Esprit de rupture, Bruxelles, Edition Pop-Copy, 1995.
- Désir de vérité (Livre-Entretien avec Maître Nimy Mayidika Ngimbi), Bruxelles, Editions Havaux, 1997.
- Drame familial (Théâtre populaire), en collaboration, Kinshasa, Edition Safari, 2000.
- Pacte de sang (Ballet), en collaboration, Kinshasa, Editions Safari, 2000.
- Conspiration du silence (Théâtre), en collaboration, Kinshasa, Edition Safari, 2000.
- Les jeunes sans toit à Kinshasa (Etude du phénomène des enfants de la rue), Kinshasa, Editions Universitaires Africaines, 2001.
- L'Univers des jeunes sans toit, Kinshasa, Editions Arc-En-Ciel, 2001.
- L'avenir à bras le corps. Prospective pour le développement de la République Démocratique du Congo, Kinshasa, Editions Universitaires Africaines, 2001.
- Le Chantier de la paix, Partenariat pour la paix et le Co-développement dans la région des Grands Lacs, Kinshasa, Editions Safari, 2002.
- Panda Farnana : premier universitaire Congolais 1888–1930, éditions L'Harmattan, 2005, 358 pages.
- Sortir de la pauvreté : la révolution du bon sens au Congo, éditions L'Harmattan, 2006, 243 pages.
- Développer son leadership Une gestion transparente et solidaire selon la doctrine sociale de l'église sous la direction du Père Martin Ekwa bis Isal, S.J., Edition CADICEC, 2008.
- La naissance du Congo : De L'Égypte à Mbanza Kongo, éditions L'Harmattan, 2009,ISBN 978-2-296-07042-4.
- Les États-Unis du bassin du Congo, Une éco-région pour un codéveloppement, éditions L'Harmattan, 2012, 220 pages, ISBN 978-2-336-00224-8
- La révolution du pouvoir-faire : Pour une économie du bien commun au Congo, éditions L'Harmattan, 2012, 351 pages.
- Le baptême des baptisés. Roman, éditions L'Harmattan, Paris,2015.
- Réécrire l'histoire, éditions L'Harmattan, Paris. 2017.
- Plaidoyer pour une histoire autobiographique du Congo, éditions L'Harmattan, Paris,2017.
- Le livre bleu, 34 projets décisifs pour bâtir le nouveau Congo, éditions L'Harmattan, Paris, 2018.
- Manifeste pour un Sénat nouveau, éditions L'Harmattan, Paris, 2019.
- La Rumba congolaise. Histoire et économie, éditions L'Harmattan, Paris, 2019.

== Awards ==
- 2014: Gold and Silver medal of the Prix National du Mérite de la Culture et des Arts.
- 2015: Prix Lovo for Best Congolese Book of the Year.
- 2017: Prix Européen de littérature Congolaise.
- 2019: Ambassadeur du livre in the Democratic Republic of the Congo by the Publishing Houses éditions MédiasPaul and Paulines.
- 2019: Prix Makomi d'honneur at the Fête du livre de Kinshasa.
