= 4th arrondissement of Paris =

- Municipal arrondissement
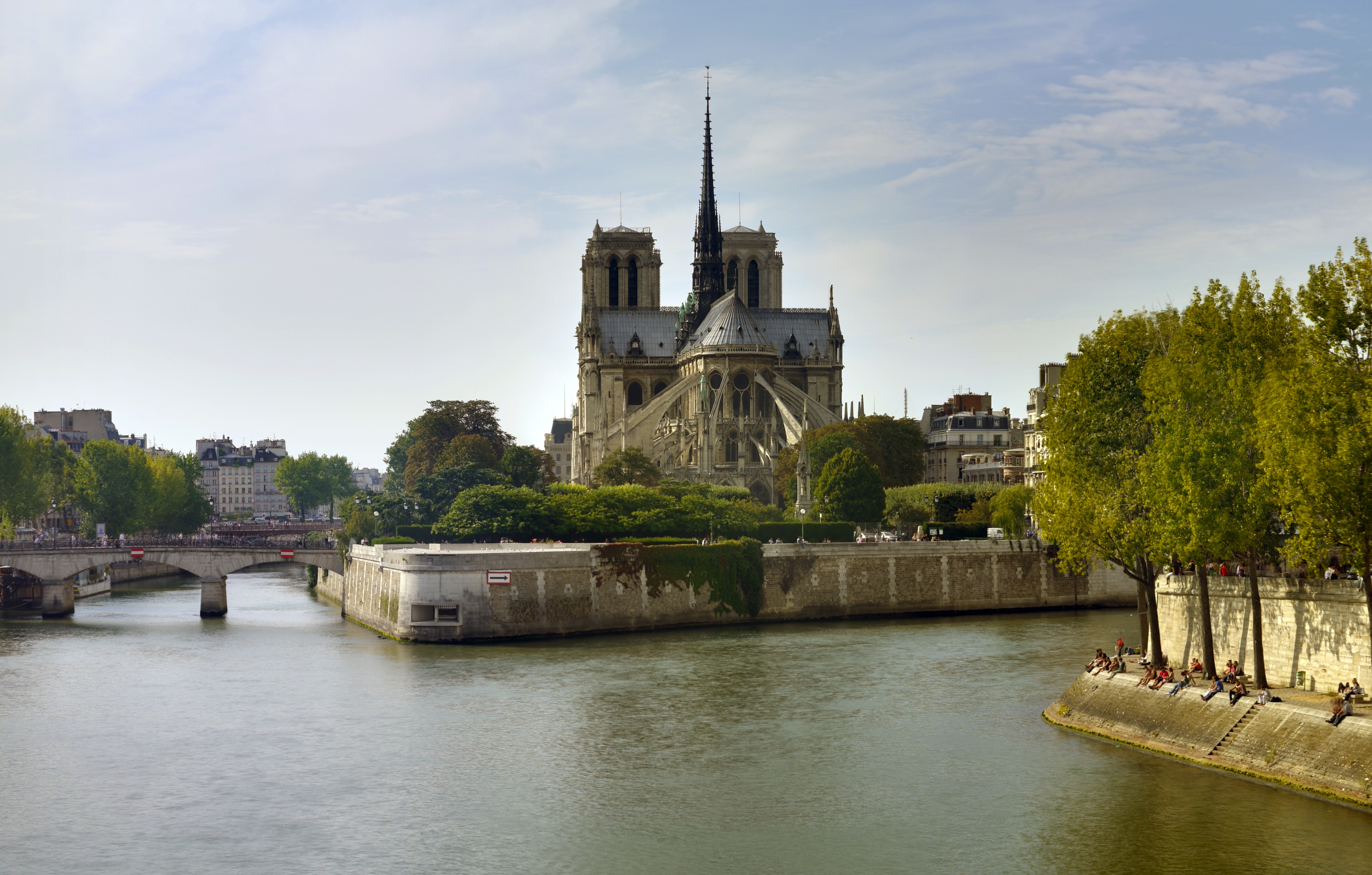
- Notre-Dame, on the Île de la Cité

- Coat of arms

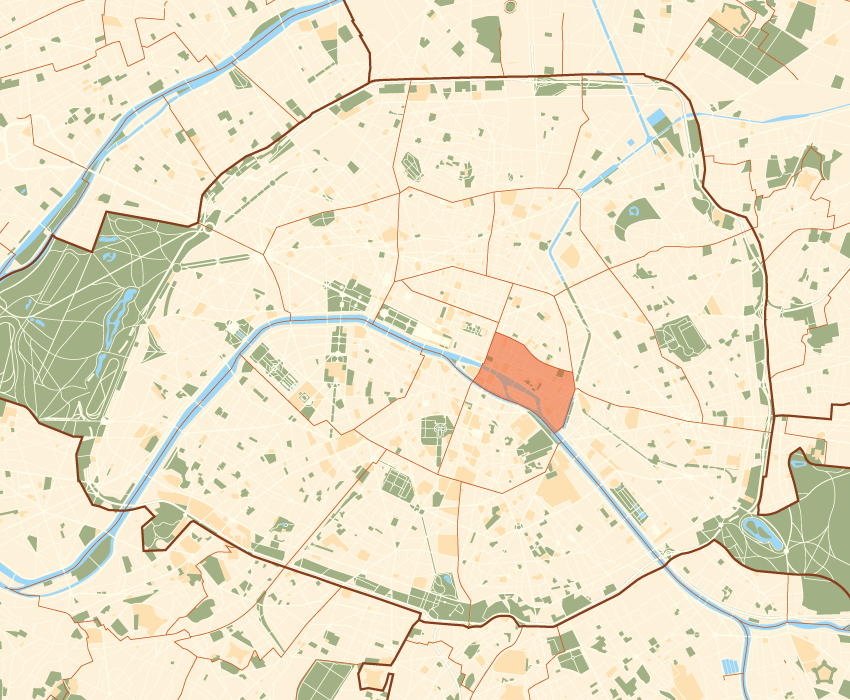
- Location within Paris
- Coordinates: 48°51′20″N 2°21′20″E
- Country: France
- Region: Île-de-France
- Department: Paris
- Commune: Paris

Government
  - Mayor (2020–2026): Ariel Weil (PS)
- Area: 1.60 km^{2} (0.62 sq mi)
- Population (2023): 27,332
  - Density: 17,100/km^{2} (44,200/sq mi)
- INSEE code: 75104

The 4th arrondissement of Paris (French: IV^{e} arrondissement, IPA: [katʁijɛm aʁɔ̃dismɑ̃]) is one of the twenty arrondissements of Paris, the capital city of France. In spoken French, this arrondissement is referred to as quatrième. Along with the 1st, 2nd and 3rd arrondissements, it is in the first sector of Paris, which maintains a single local government rather than four separate ones. In 2023, it had a population of 27,332.

The arrondissement, also known as Hôtel-de-Ville, is situated on the right bank of the River Seine. It contains the Renaissance-era Paris City Hall, rebuilt between 1874 and 1882. It also contains the Renaissance square of Place des Vosges, the overtly modern Pompidou Centre, and the lively southern part of the medieval district of Le Marais, which today is known for being the gay district of Paris. (The quieter northern part of Le Marais is within the 3rd arrondissement). The eastern part of the Île de la Cité (including Notre-Dame de Paris) and all of the Île Saint-Louis are also included within the 4th arrondissement.

The 4th arrondissement is known for its little streets, cafés, and shops but is often regarded by Parisians as expensive and congested. It has old buildings and a mix of many cultures.

== Geography ==
With a land area of 1.601 km^{2} (0.618 sq mi; 396 acres), the 4th arrondissement is the third smallest arrondissement in the city.

It is bordered to the west by the 1st arrondissement, to the north by the 3rd, to the east by the 11th and 12th, and to the south by the Seine and the 5th.

== Demographics ==
The peak of population of the 4th arrondissement occurred before 1861, though the arrondissement was defined in its current shape only since the re-organization of Paris in 1860. In 1999, the arrondissement hosted 41,424 jobs.

=== Historical population ===
Historical population

Year	Pop.	±% p.a.
1861	108,520	—
1872	95,003	−1.20%
1881	103,260	+0.93%
1891	100,046	−0.32%
1901	100,329	+0.03%
1911	100,377	+0.00%
1921	91,741	−0.90%
1931	83,063	−0.99%
1936	70,944	−3.10%
1946	60,082	−1.65%
1954	66,621	+1.30%

Year	Pop.	±% p.a.
1962	61,670	−0.96%
1968	54,029	−2.18%
1975	40,466	−4.05%
1982	33,990	−2.46%
1990	32,226	−0.66%
1999	30,675	−0.55%
2007	28,572	−0.88%
2012	27,769	−0.57%
2017	28,088	+0.23%
2023	27,332	−0.45%

Source: Demographia (1861-1999) and INSEE (1876-2023)

=== Immigration ===
Place of birth of residents of the 4th arrondissement in 1999
Born in metropolitan France	Born outside metropolitan France			
78.1%	21.9%			
78.1%	Born in overseas France	Born in foreign countries with French citizenship at birth^{1}	EU-15 immigrants^{2}	Non-EU-15 immigrants
78.1%	0.7%	4.8%	5.6%	10.8%
^{1} This group is made up largely of former French settlers, such as pieds-noirs in Northwest Africa, followed by former colonial citizens who had French citizenship at birth (such as was often the case for the native elite in French colonies), as well as to a lesser extent foreign-born children of French expatriates. A foreign country is understood as a country not part of France in 1999, so a person born for example in 1950 in Algeria, when Algeria was an integral part of France, is nonetheless listed as a person born in a foreign country in French statistics.^{2} An immigrant is a person born in a foreign country not having French citizenship at birth. An immigrant may have acquired French citizenship since moving to France, but is still considered an immigrant in French statistics. On the other hand, persons born in France with foreign citizenship (the children of immigrants) are not listed as immigrants.

== History ==
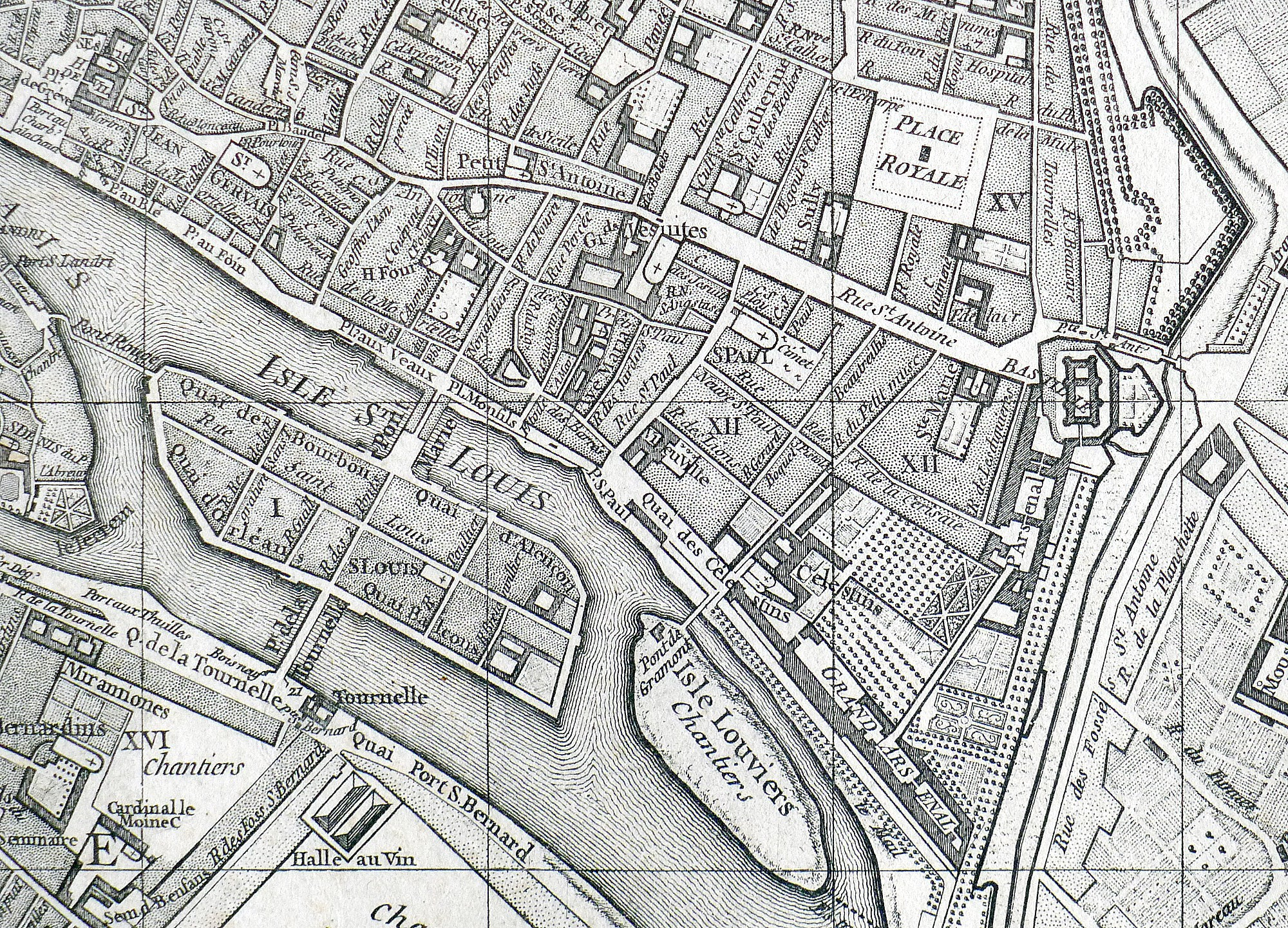
Robert de Vaugondy's map of Paris (4th arrondissement) - 1760

The Île de la Cité has been inhabited since the 1st century BC, when it was occupied by the Parisii tribe of the Gauls. The Right Bank was first settled in the 5th century.

Since the end of the 19th century, le Marais has been populated by a significant Jewish population, the Rue des Rosiers being at the heart of its community. There are a handful of kosher restaurants, and Jewish institutions. Since the 1990s, gay culture has influenced the arrondissement, with new residents opening a number of bars and cafés in the area by the town hall.

== Map ==
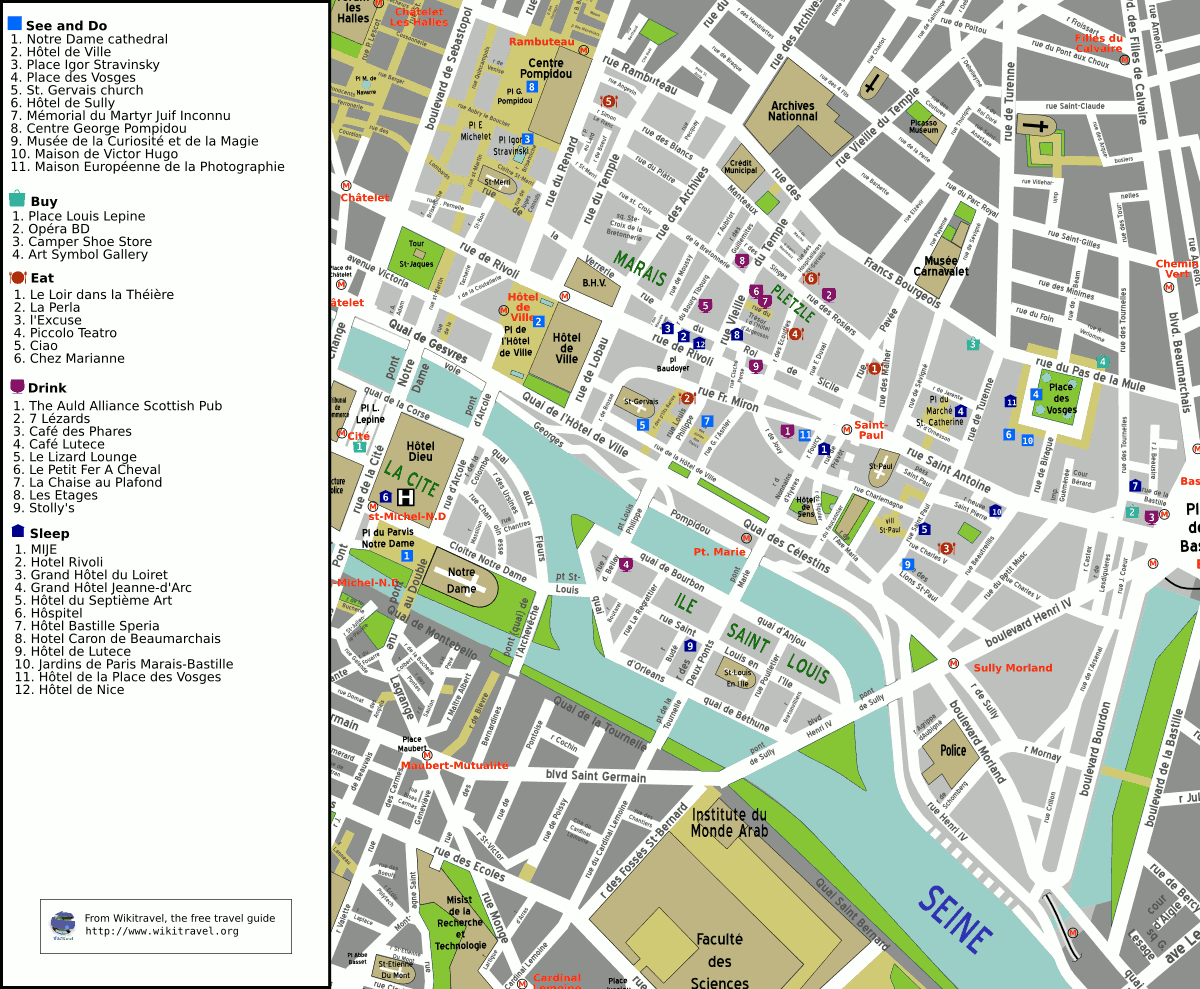
Map of the 4th arrondissement

== Cityscape ==
=== Quarters ===
The quarters of the 4th arrondissement

- Quartier Saint-Merri (13)
- Quartier Saint-Gervais (14)
- Quartier Notre-Dame (15)
- Quartier Arsenal (16)

=== Places of interest in the arrondissement ===
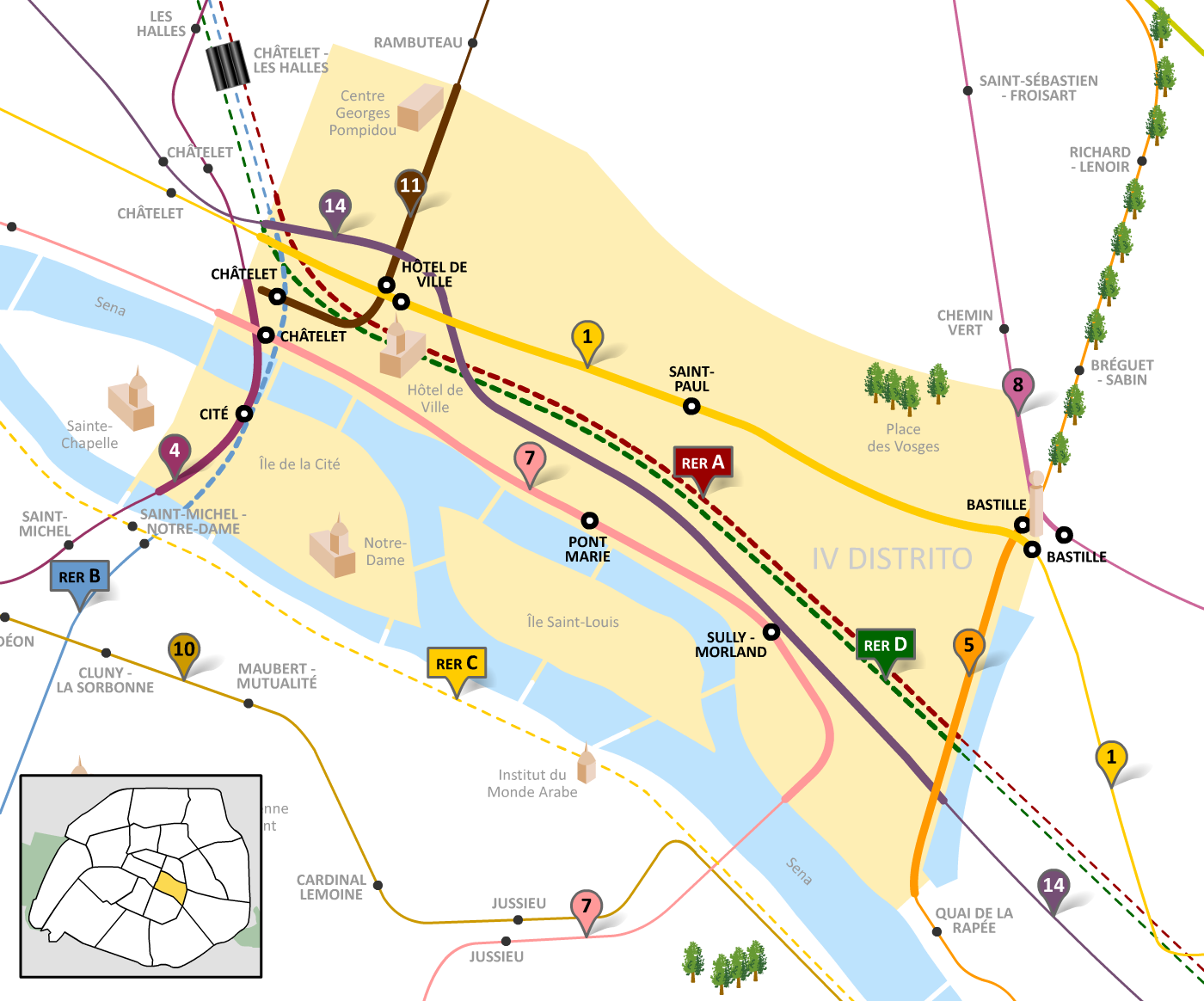

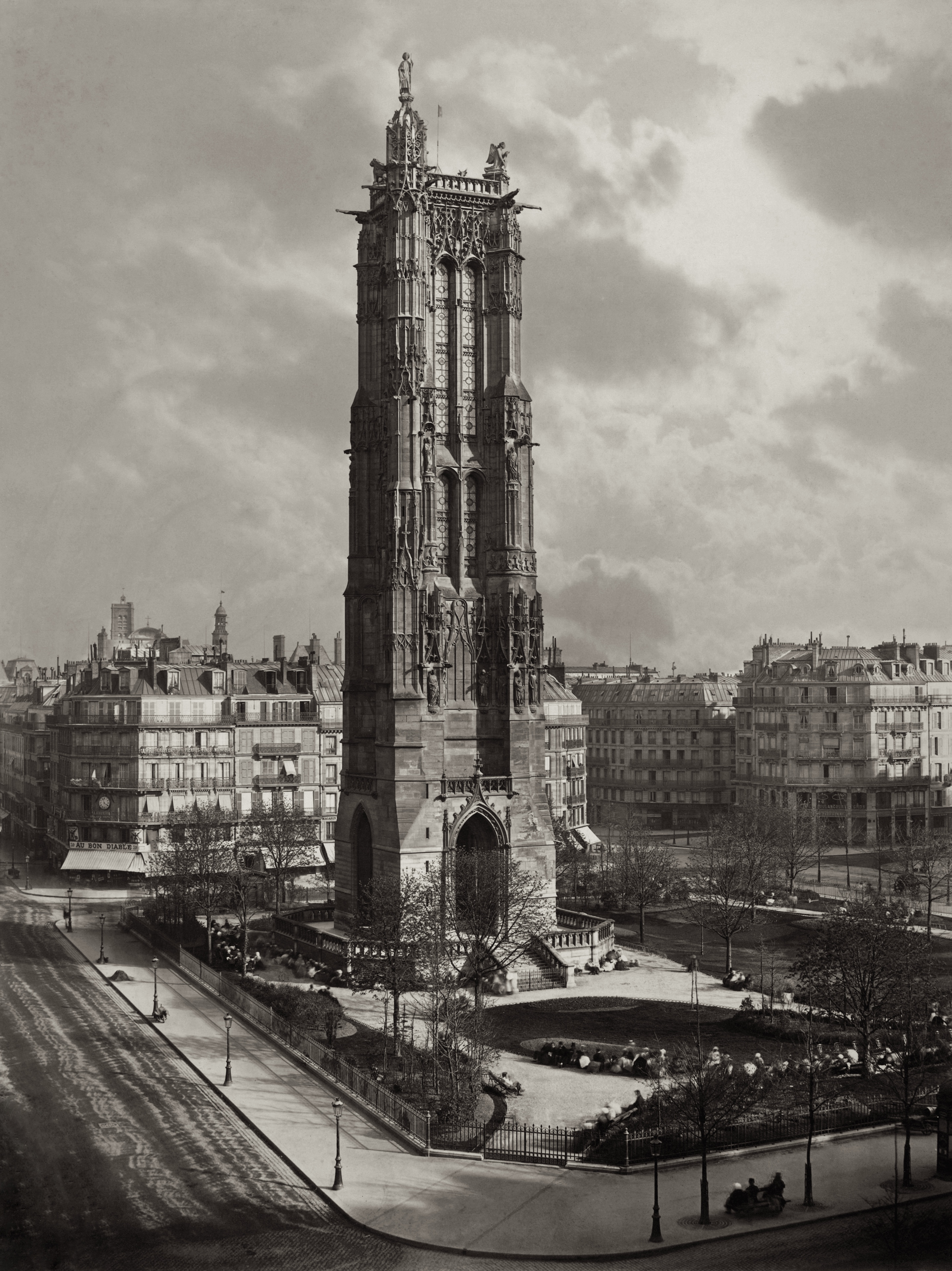
Saint-Jacques Tower c. 1867

- Bazar de l'Hôtel de Ville department store
- Berthillon
- Bibliothèque de l'Arsenal
- Centre Georges Pompidou
- Chapelle dorée, Paris
- Hôtel-Dieu hospital
- Hôtel de Sens
- Hôtel de Sully, on the site of a former orangery
- Hôtel de Ville
- Le Marais
- Rue des Rosiers
- Lycée Charlemagne
- Maison européenne de la photographie
- Marché aux fleurs, Place Louis Lépine
- Mémorial de la Shoah
- Musée Boleslas Biegas, Musée Adam Mickiewicz, and Salon Frédéric Chopin
- Musée de la Magie
- Notre-Dame de Paris
- Pavillon de l'Arsenal
- Prefecture of Police
- Quai des Célestins
- Saint-Jacques Tower
- St-Gervais-et-St-Protais Church
- Saint-Louis-en-l'Île Church
- Salle des Traditions de la Garde Républicaine
- Former Temple, fortress and later prison
- Temple du Marais
- Église Saint-Merri
- Chapelle dorée, Paris

=== Main streets and squares ===
- Place de la Bastille (shared with the 11th and 12th arrondissements), including the July Column (Colonne de juillet)
- Place de l'Hôtel de Ville, formerly Place de Grève
- Place des Vosges (shared with the 3rd arrondissement)
- Place du Châtelet (shared with the 1st arrondissement)
- Place Saint-Gervais, outside the doors of the St-Gervais-et-St-Protais Church
- Rue de Rivoli (shared with the 1st arrondissement)
- Square Barye

== Education ==
Lycée Charlemagne is located in the arrondissement, as well as Haredi Jewish institutions Yad Mordekhai.

== Transport ==
Metro stations within, partially or fully, the 4th arrondissement:

- Bastille
- Châtelet
- Cité
- Hôtel de Ville
- Pont Marie
- Rambuteau
- Saint-Paul
- Sully – Morland
