= Centre Wallonie-Bruxelles =

Art center in Paris, France

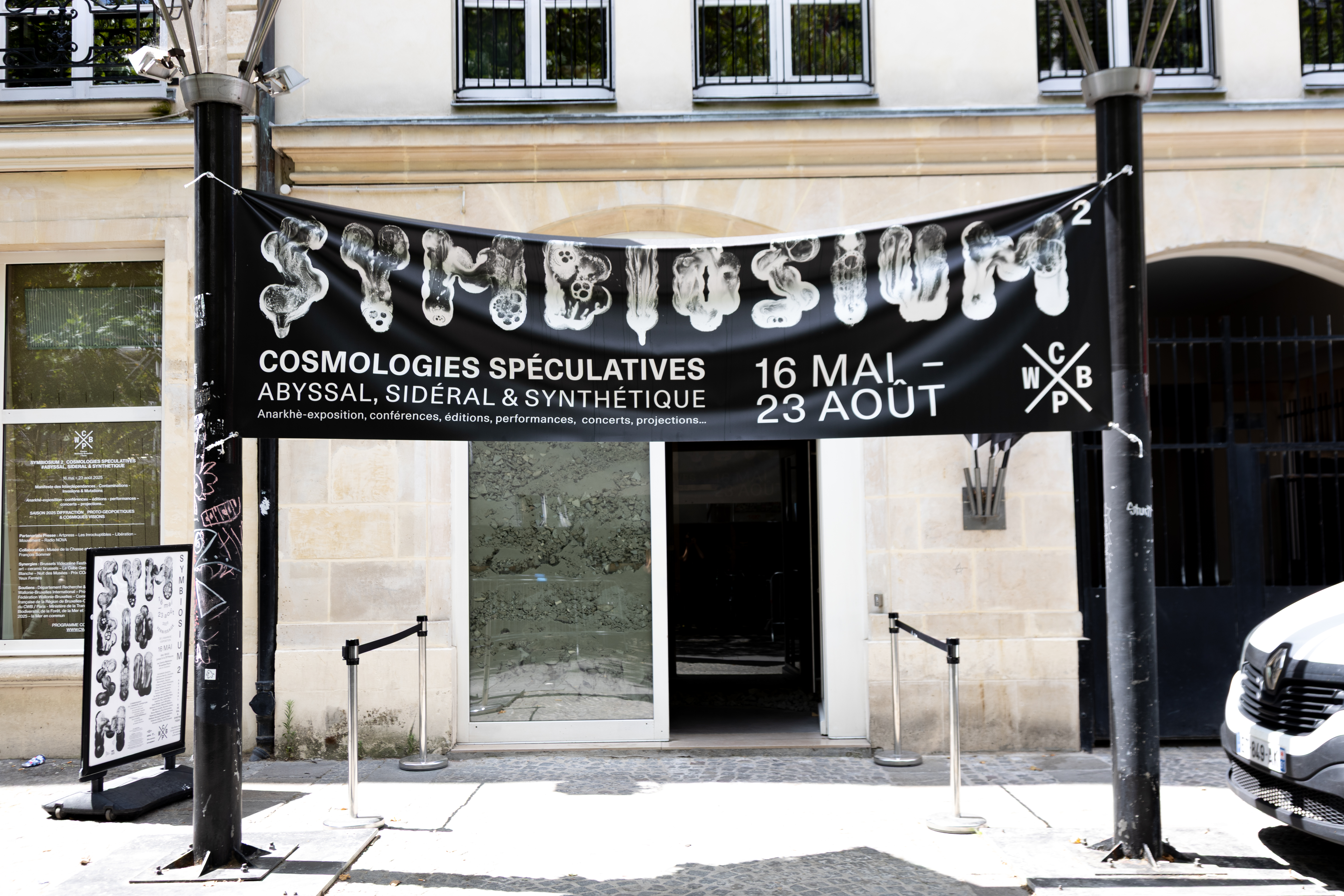
- Front of the center in 2025
- Interactive map of the Centre Wallonie-Bruxelles area

General information
- Location: 127-129 Rue Saint-Martin 75004, Paris, France
- Coordinates: 48.86105615125048°N 2.351239148106859°E
- Opened: 1979

The Centre Wallonie-Bruxelles is an art center in Paris, France. Located beside the Centre Pompidou, it is dedicated to highlighting artists from the French Community of Belgium and providing a space for Belgian contemporary art in France.

== History ==
The center was founded in 1979 as a site for Belgian contemporary art in France. It is one site of the broader organization, Wallonie-Bruxelles International.

In 2018, Stéphanie Pécourt became the center's director and began shifting the center's priorities away from comics and more toward "singularities, young people, performance, graphic arts, digital technology, and women." She assumed the position from previous director Anne Lenoir.

In 2022–2023, the center closed for its first ever set of renovations since 1979. During then, the center gathered 80 artists for an exhibition, Les Heures Sauvages – Nef des marges dans l'ombre des certitudes, which was a festival of "performances, concerts, DJ sets, screenings, readings, and meetings," among other things.

== Programming ==
=== Exhibitions ===
The center has been the site of numerous temporary and traveling exhibitions, such as a Henri Michaux exhibit in 2017, an Eva Medin exhibit in 2023, a Chantal Akerman programming series and Jennifer Caubet exhibit in 2024, and Speculative Cosmologies in 2025.

=== Screenings ===
The center has several screens and regularly shows films. In 2018, the center screened Jacques Feyder's Atlantis for its hundredth anniversary, following its 4K restoration.

Some years, the center, in collaboration with the Brussels Francophone Parliament and the Centre du Cinéma et de l'Audiovisuel de la Fédération Wallonie-Bruxelles, hosts the Le Court en dit long where Belgian film is screened, spotlighted, and entered into competition for awards.

=== Other ===
The center often participates in annual Nuit Blanche and Nuit des Musées programming. It additionally screens film for the Festival des Nouveaux Cinémas, as well as hosts roundtable and panel discussions.
