= List of museums in Paris =

There are around 130 museums in Paris, France, within city limits. This list also includes suburban museums within the "Grand Paris" area, such as the Air and Space Museum.

The sixteen museums of the City of Paris are annotated with "VP", as well as six other ones also accommodated in municipal premises and the Musées de France (fr) listed by the ministry of culture are annotated with "MF".

== List ==
=== Paris ===
Name	Image	Arrondissement	Type	Summary
Arab World Institute		5th	Culture	(MF) History, ancient and medieval archeology, arts and crafts, ethnographic and contemporary art of the countries of the Arab world
Archaeological Crypt of the Paris Notre-Dame		4th	Archaeological	(VP) Remains under Notre Dame de Paris of buildings dating back to the city's early days
Art Ludique		13th	Art	Exhibitions of contemporary art in comic books, manga, cinema, live animation and videogames
Bibliothèque-Musée de l'Opéra National de Paris		9th	Opera	Library and museum about the Paris Opera, part of the Music Department of the National Library of France
Bibliothèque Polonaise de Paris		4th	Biographical	Includes three small museums about Polish natives: Musée Adam Mickiewicz about the poet, Musée Boleslas Biegas with paintings and sculpture by the artist and other Polish artists, and Salon Frédéric Chopin about the composer
Cabinet des Médailles		2nd	Numismatic	Located in the Bibliothèque nationale de France, includes coins, medals, antiques from the ancient Near East, Greece, Rome, and national antiquities
Catacombes de Paris		14th	History	(VP) Underground ossuary with the remains of over six million people
Cité de l'Architecture et du Patrimoine		16th	Architecture	Located in the Palais de Chaillot, includes Musée national des Monuments Français with plaster casts of French architecture, gallery of reproduced wall paintings and stained-glass windows from historic monuments, French and international architecture from 1850 to the present
Cité des Sciences et de l'Industrie		19th	Science	Hands-on science exhibits, includes the French submarine Argonaute (S636)
Cité nationale de l'histoire de l'immigration		12th	Ethnic	(MF) History and culture of immigration in France from the 19th century to the present, located in the Palais de la Porte Dorée
Espace Dalí		18th	Art	Life of and sculptures, engravings and paintings of Salvador Dalí
Espace Fondation EDF			Art	New media exhibitions and exhibitions about society and culture
Fondation Cartier pour l'Art Contemporain		14th	Art	Contemporary art
Fondation Custodia		7th	Art	Frits Lugt collection of European drawings, prints, paintings, books and artists' letters from the 15th to 19th century, focusing on Dutch and Flemish Old Masters, Italian and French artists
Fondation Jean Dubuffet	N/A	6th	Art	Works by Jean Dubuffet, also main museum in Périgny, Val-de-Marne
Fondation Louis Vuitton		16th	Art	Contemporary art
Galerie des Gobelins		13th	Decorative arts	Exhibitions of Gobelins tapestries
Galerie nationale du Jeu de Paume		1st	Photography	(MF) Modern and postmodern photography and media
Galeries nationales du Grand Palais		8th	Art	Art exhibits and cultural events programmed by the Réunion des musées nationaux et du Grand Palais des Champs-Élysées
Henri Cartier-Bresson Foundation		3rd	Photography	Archives and work of photographers Henri Cartier-Bresson and Martine Franck, exhibitions of other photographers, painters, sculptors, and illustrators
Institut Tessin		3rd	Art	Swedish art and culture
Maison d'Auguste Comte		6th	Historic house	Restored 19th-century period rooms of positivist philosopher Auguste Comte (1798–1857), one of the 32 Maisons des illustres (fr) in the region Île de France
Maison de Balzac		16th	Historic house	(VP) Restored 19th-century rooms with mementos of author novelist Honoré de Balzac
Maison européenne de la photographie		4th	Photography	(VP premises) Contemporary photography
Maison Gainsbourg		7th	Historic house	Museum dedicated to Serge Gainsbourg, in his former home in Paris
Maison de Victor Hugo		4th	Historic house	(VP) Restored 19th-century house of author novelist Victor Hugo
Maison La Roche		16th	Historic house	Operated by Fondation Le Corbusier, 1920s house designed by Le Corbusier and Pierre Jeanneret, exhibits art collection and archives of Le Corbusier
Maxim's Art Nouveau "Collection 1900"		8th	Decorative art	Art Nouveau objects and decor, located above Maxim's restaurant
Mémorial de la Shoah		4th	History	History of the Holocaust and French Jews in World War II
Minerals collection of Pierre and Marie Curie University	N/A	5th	Geology	1500 minerals on display in 24 display cases
Mundolingua		6th	Science	Information, objects and documents relating to language, linguistic diversity and linguistics
Musée – Librairie du Compagnonnage		6th	History	History of French trade guilds, skilled craftsmen in fields such as cooking, pastry, plumbing, ironworks, masonry, cabinetmaking, carpentry
Musée Adzak		14th	Art	Exhibits paintings, sculpture, and photography by a wide range of artists
Musée "Bible et Terre Sainte"	N/A	6th	Archaeology	Archaeological artifacts arranged to show everyday life in Palestine from 5000 BCE to 600 CE
Musée Baccarat		16th	Decorative art	Baccarat fine glass work, including vases, dishes and stemware, and limited-edition collections
Musée Bourdelle		15th	Art	(VP) Sculptures, art and studio of Antoine Bourdelle
Musée Carnavalet		3rd	Multiple	(VP) City of Paris' history, culture, art, archaeology, decorative arts
Musée Cernuschi		8th	Art	(VP) Asian art, specializing in works from China, Japan, and Korea
Musée Clemenceau		16th	Historic house	Apartment and garden of Georges Clemenceau (1841–1929), French statesman and writer
Musée Cognacq-Jay		3rd	Art	(VP) 18th-century French fine and decorative art
Musée Curie		5th	Science	History of radiology research and the work of Pierre and Marie Curie
Musée d'Art Dentaire Pierre Fauchard	N/A	16th	Medical	Dental history, tools and apparatus
Musée d'Art et d'Histoire du Judaïsme		3rd	Jewish	Jewish art and history, history of the Jews in France since the Middle Ages and in the communities of Europe and North Africa
Musée d'Art Moderne de la Ville de Paris		16th	Art	(VP) Modern and Contemporary art of the 20th and 21st centuries
Musée d'Art Naïf – Max Fourny		18th	Art	(VP premises) Exhibitions of folk art, naive art, and outsider art
Musée d'Ennery		16th	Art	Asian art with a focus on China and Japan
Musée d’histoire de la médecine		6th	Medical	Located at the second floor of the Paris Descartes University, features historic medical instruments and apparatus
Musée d'Orsay		7th	Art	Mainly French art dating from 1848 to 1914, including paintings, sculptures, furniture, and photography; houses the largest collection of Impressionist and post-Impressionist masterpieces in the world
Musée de l'Armée		7th	Military	Located in the Hôtel national des Invalides, national military museum of France, includes Musée des Plans-Reliefs, weapons, uniforms, regalia, armor, artillery, Napoleon's Tomb
Musée de l'Éventail		10th	Fashion	Hand fans and fan-making
Musée des Archives Nationales		3rd	History	Exhibit of documents drawn from the Archives Nationales
Musée de l'Homme		16th	Anthropology	Human evolution and the history of human sciences
Musée de l'Orangerie		1st	Art	Gallery of Impressionist and post-Impressionist paintings, features eight Water Lilies murals by Claude Monet
Musée de l'Ordre de la Libération		7th	Military	Located in the Hôtel national des Invalides, history of the Free French Forces in World War II
Musée de la Chasse et de la Nature		3rd	Sports	Sport of hunting, includes hunting weapons, accessories, trophies, art and decorative art, stuffed animal mounts
Musée de la Contrefaçon		16th	Law enforcement	History of counterfeiting objects
Musée de la Franc-Maçonnerie	N/A	9th	Masonic	History of Freemasonry in France, regalia, artifacts
Musée de la Magie	N/A	4th	Magic	Items relating to magic shows, including optical illusions, secret boxes, wind-up toys, magic mirrors, see-through glasses, posters, holds magic shows
Musée de la Cinémathèque	N/A	12th	Film	Part of the Cinémathèque Française, history of film and pre-cinema in France and around the world
Musée du 11 Conti - Monnaie de Paris		6th	Numismatic	Part of the Monnaie de Paris. Heritage collections, workshops of excellence
Musée de la Musique		19th	Music	Part of the Cité de la Musique, musical instruments, art
Musée de La Poste		15th	Philatelic	Postage stamps and postal history of France, currently closed for renovation
Musée de la Sculpture en Plein Air		5th	Art	(VP) Outdoor sculptures from the second half of the twentieth century on display along the banks of the Seine
Musée de la Vie Romantique		9th	Multiple	(VP) 19th house with Romantic-period art and decorative art, mementos of author George Sand
Musée de Minéralogie		6th	Geology	Minerals, rocks, ores, gems, artificial minerals
Musée de Montmartre		18th	Local	(VP premises) Local history through paintings, photographs, posters and manuscripts
Musée des Arts Décoratifs		1st	Decorative arts	Includes decorative arts (furniture, glass, ceramics and more), interior design, fashion, textiles, advertising, graphic arts
Musée des Arts et Métiers		3rd	Technology	History of technology and industry, including advances in scientific instruments, materials, energy, mechanics, construction, communication and transport
Musée des Arts Forains		12th	Amusement	Funfair objects including amusement rides, fair stalls and restored attractions, merry-go-rounds and carousels, German swings
Musée des Collections Historiques de la Préfecture de Police	N/A	5th	Law enforcement	History of policing in France
Musée des Égouts de Paris		7th	History	(VP) History of tours of the Paris sewer system, role of sewer workers and methods of water treatment
Musée des Lunettes et Lorgnettes Pierre Marly	N/A	1st	Medical	History of eyewear, includes lorgnettes, glasses, telescopes, and binoculars
Musée des moulages dermatologiques de l'hôpital Saint-Louis	N/A	10th	Medical	Part of the historic building of the Hôpital Saint-Louis, features 19th-century wax casts of dermatological problems
Musée des Plans-Reliefs		7th	Military	Located in the Hôtel national des Invalides, military models of fortified cities created between 1668 and 1870
Musée du Barreau de Paris		1st	Law enforcement	History of the Paris Bar and its lawyers
Musée du Fumeur	N/A	11th	Smoking	Includes smoking pipes, Egyptian sheeshas, snuffboxes, cigars, tobacco samples, hemp-fiber clothing, etchings, portraits, photographs, videos, and scientific drawings of tobacco plants
Musée du Louvre		1st	Art	world's largest museum, includes paintings, prints and drawings, sculpture, decorative arts, Egyptian antiquities, Near Eastern antiquities, Greek, Etruscan and Roman antiquities, Islamic art
Musée du Général Leclerc de Hauteclocque et de la Libération de Paris – Musée Jean Moulin		15th	History	(VP) History of Maréchal Philippe Leclerc de Hauteclocque, Jean Moulin, a major figure of the French Resistance, and the liberation of Paris in World War II
Musée du Luxembourg		6th	Art	Changing exhibitions of art
Musée du Parfum Fragonard		9th	Fashion	History and process of perfume, antique perfume bottles, containers, toiletry sets, 19th-century period rooms
Musée du quai Branly		7th	Art	Indigenous art and cultures of Africa, Asia, Oceania, and the Americas
Musée du Service de santé des armées		5th	Medical	History of medical care for armed services in France
Musée du Service des Objets Trouvés		15th		Items that have ended up in the Lost and Found department of the Paris Police
Musée du Vin		16th	Wine	History of the French craft of winemaking, includes tools and objects used to work the grapevine and the wine, a wine cellar, cooperage
Musée Édith Piaf	N/A	11th	Biographical	Life of singer Édith Piaf
Musée Edouard Branly		6th	Biographical	Life of radio pioneer Édouard Branly, includes his research laboratory and equipment, open by appointment
Musée en Herbe		1st	Children's	Art museum for children
Musée Grévin		9th	Wax	Scenes from the history of France and modern life
Musée Jacquemart-André		8th	Historic house	19th-century period house with major art collection
Musée Maillol		7th	Art	Works by Aristide Maillol and art exhibitions
Musée Marmottan Monet		16th	Art	Features over three hundred Impressionist and Post-Impressionist works by Claude Monet, other Impressionist and Post-Impressionist art, illuminated manuscripts, Napoleonic era art and furniture, Italian and Flemish primitive paintings
Musée Moissan	N/A	6th	Biographical	Open by appointment, life of Henri Moissan (1852–1907), winner of the 1906 Nobel Prize in chemistry
Musée National d'Art Moderne		4th	Art	Located at the Centre Georges-Pompidou, modern and contemporary art
Musée national de la Légion d'Honneur et des Ordres de Chevalerie		7th	Military	History of France's honors, medals, decorations, and knightly orders from Louis XI to the present, including Napoleonic souvenirs and more than 300 portraits
Musée national de la Marine		16th	Maritime	Includes ship model, maritime art, artifacts, photos
Musée national des Arts asiatiques-Guimet		16th	Art	Asian art, also known as Musée Guimet
Musée national du Moyen Âge		5th	Decorative arts	Formerly Musée de Cluny, Medieval art, houses six The Lady and the Unicorn tapestries, remnants of the third century Gallo-Roman baths
Musée national Eugène Delacroix		6th	Art	Life and works of Eugène Delacroix
Musée national Gustave Moreau		9th	Art	Home and studio of Symbolist painter Gustave Moreau (1826-1898)
Musée national Jean-Jacques Henner		17th	Art	House and works of painter Jean-Jacques Henner (1829–1905)
Musée Nissim de Camondo		8th	Historic house	Museum of French decorative arts displayed as in a wealthy private home
Musée Pasteur		15th	Biographical	Life of scientist Louis Pasteur
Musée Picasso		3rd	Art	Life and work of artist Pablo Picasso, also works by Cézanne, Degas, Rousseau, Seurat, de Chirico and Matisse, Iberian bronzes, African art
Musée Pierre Cardin	N/A	4th	Fashion	Over 250 Haute Couture designs from 1950 to 2000 designed by Pierre Cardin
Musée Rodin		7th	Art	Works of the French sculptors Auguste Rodin and Camille Claudel, located in the Hôtel Biron
Musée Valentin Haüy	N/A	7th	Medical	History of the blind and of the methods that gave them access to culture
Musée Yves Saint Laurent Paris		16th	Fashion	Opening in 2017, operated by the Fondation Pierre Bergé – Yves Saint Laurent, works by fashion designer Yves Saint Laurent
Musée Zadkine		6th	Art	(VP) House and work of sculptor Ossip Zadkine (1890–1967)
Muséum national d'Histoire naturelle		5th	Natural history	Includes galleries for minerals and gems, fossils and dinosaurs and comparative anatomy, and the Grand Gallery of Evolution
Palais de la Découverte		8th	Science	Includes interactive exhibits for mathematics, physics, astronomy, chemistry, geology and biology
Palais de Tokyo		16th	Art	Modern and contemporary art
Palais Galliera		16th	Fashion	(VP) Also known as Musée de la Mode et du Costume de la Ville de Paris, fashion and fashion history, includes exhibits of French fashion design and costume from the eighteenth century to the present; closed between exhibitions
Pavillon de l'Arsenal		4th	Architecture	(VP premises) Architecture and urban planning
Pavillon de l'eau		16th	Technology	(VP premises) History of the city's water supply
Petit Musée de l'Argenterie	N/A	12th	Decorative arts	Decorative arts made of silver
Petit Palais		8th	Art	(VP) Paintings, sculpture, Ancient Greek and Roman art, Renaissance art and artifacts, 17th, 18th and 19th century art and artifacts, art from the Western and Eastern Christian worlds, engravings and drawings, photography
Salle des Traditions de la Garde Républicaine		4th	Military	History of the Garde Républicaine
Tenniseum	N/A	16th	Sports	Part of Roland Garros Stadium
Théâtre-Musée des Capucines	N/A	2nd	Fashion	Perfume
Tour Jean-sans-Peur		2nd	History	History of the medieval tower and medieval Paris
World Heritage Centre		7th	Historic site	Tours of the UNESCO headquarters

=== Grand Paris ===
Name	Location	Department	Type	Summary
Atelier Grognard	Rueil-Malmaison	Hauts-de-Seine	Art	Changing exhibitions of art
Musée Adrien Mentienne	Bry-sur-Marne	Val-de-Marne	Local	Local history, house of Louis Daguerre
Château de Grosbois	Boissy-Saint-Léger	Val-de-Marne	Historic house	17th century castle
Château de Vincennes	Vincennes	Val-de-Marne	Historic house	Massive 14th and 17th century French royal fortress
Écomusée du Val de Bièvres	Fresnes	Val-de-Marne	Local	Local history and ethnology in a medieval farm
Exploradôme	Vitry-sur-Seine	Val-de-Marne	Science	Interactive exhibits about science including optical illusions, turbulent motion, structures and forms, and movement
Expo-Musée Renault	Boulogne-Billancourt	Hauts-de-Seine	Automotive	History of Renault automobiles
Fondation Arp	Clamart	Hauts-de-Seine	Art	Studio of Jean Arp and Sophie Taeuber
Fondation Jean Dubuffet	Périgny-sur-Yerres	Val-de-Marne	Art	Works of Jean Dubuffet
La Contemporaine	Nanterre	Hauts-de-Seine	History	Exhibits of French and international history through its collections of art, photographs, posters, political cartoons and objects
Maison de la photographie Robert Doisneau	Gentilly	Val-de-Marne	Photography	Humanist photography and works of Parisian photographer Robert Doisneau
Mémorial du Mont-Valérien	Suresnes	Hauts-de-Seine	Military	Place of execution of resistants and hostages during WWII
Musée Albert-Kahn	Boulogne-Billancourt	Hauts-de-Seine	Photography	Historic photographs and film collected by the banker and philanthropist Albert Kahn
Musée d'Art Contemporain du Val-de-Marne	Vitry-sur-Seine	Val-de-Marne	Art	Contemporary art
Musée d'Art et d'Histoire de Colombes	Colombes	Hauts-de-Seine	Local	Art and local history
Musée d'Art et d'Histoire de Meudon	Meudon	Hauts-de-Seine	Local	Landscape painting, contemporary art and postwar history of Meudon
Musée d'art et d'histoire de Saint-Denis	Saint-Denis	Seine-Saint-Denis	Local	Local art and history, in the former Carmel of Saint-Denis
Musée d'Art et d'Histoire de Saint-Ouen	Saint-Ouen	Seine-Saint-Denis	Local	Art and history, in the castle of Saint-Ouen
Musée d'Histoire Locale de Rueil-Malmaison - Mémoire de la ville	Rueil-Malmaison	Hauts-de-Seine	Local	Local history, features a collection of toy soldiers, located in the former town hall
Musee d'Histoire Urbaine et Sociale de Suresnes (MUS)	Suresnes	Hauts-de-Seine	Local	Local history, area urban planning
Musée de la Colombophilie	Suresnes	Hauts-de-Seine	Military	Military dovecote, in the Fort du Mont-Valérien
Musée de la Résistance Nationale	Champigny-sur-Marne	Val-de-Marne	History	History of the French Resistance from its inception up to the Liberation in World War II
Musée de l'Air et de l'Espace	Le Bourget	Seine-Saint-Denis	Aerospace	Features 400 aircraft, 150 of which are on display, history of aviation, ballooning and space exploration
Musée de l'histoire vivante	Montreuil	Seine-Saint-Denis	Local history	Local history of the working class
Musée de Livry-Gargan - Château de la Forêt	Livry-Gargan	Seine-Saint-Denis	Local	Temporary exhibitions of art, etc.
Musée de Nogent-sur-Marne	Nogent-sur-Marne	Val-de-Marne	Local	Influence of the River Marne on art, bridges, architecture, boating, sports
Musée de Saint-Maur-des-Fossés - Villa Médicis	La Varenne-Saint-Hilaire	Val-de-Marne	Local	Local history
Musée des Années Trente	Boulogne-Billancourt	Hauts-de-Seine	Art	Fine art, decorative art, and industrial arts of the 1930s
Musée des Automates	Neuilly-sur-Seine	Hauts-de-Seine	Automates	Automates
Musée des Avelines	Saint-Cloud	Hauts-de-Seine	Local and art	Art and local history, includes the former Château de Saint-Cloud, Saint-Cloud porcelain, artist Eugène Carrière
Musée des Gardes Suisses	Rueil-Malmaison	Hauts-de-Seine	Military	History of the Swiss Guard, located in the former 18th-century barracks
Musée des Transmissions	Suresnes	Hauts-de-Seine	Military	Military transmissions equipments, in the Fort du Mont-Valérien, visit on demand
Musée des transports urbains, interurbains et ruraux	Colombes	Hauts-de-Seine	Transport	Metro, tramways, bus, etc., visit on demand
Musée des travaux publics	Courbevoie	Hauts-de-Seine	Technology and industry	Scale models of road, rail, harbour, etc. infrastructures, visit on demand
Musée du Domaine départemental de Sceaux	Sceaux	Hauts-de-Seine	Historic house	Tours of the 19th-century Château de Sceaux, includes fine art, furniture, and decorative art from former royal residences, park designed by Le Nôtre
Musée Émile Jean	Villiers-sur-Marne	Val-de-Marne	Local	Local history
Musée Fragonard d'Alfort	Maisons-Alfort	Val-de-Marne	Medical	Anatomical oddities, mostly of animals, located within the École Nationale Vétérinaire de Maisons-Alfort
Musée Français de la Carte à Jouer	Issy-les-Moulineaux	Hauts-de-Seine	Decorative arts	Historic playing cards and art and objects related to card games
Musée National de Malmaison et Bois-Préau	Rueil-Malmaison	Hauts-de-Seine	Historic house	Castle of Empress Joséphine
Musée Paul Belmondo	Boulogne-Billancourt	Hauts-de-Seine	Art	Works of sculptures Paul Belmondo
Musée Rodin	Meudon	Hauts-de-Seine	Art	Villa and studio of sculptor Auguste Rodin, also known as La Villa des Brillants
Musée Roybet Fould	Courbevoie	Hauts-de-Seine	Art	Collection of 19th works including Consuelo Fould, exhibitions of historic and contemporary art and photography
Musée-jardin Paul Landowski	Boulogne-Billancourt	Hauts-de-Seine	Art	Works by sculptor Paul Landowski
Sèvres - Cité de la céramique	Sèvres	Hauts-de-Seine	Decorative arts	Ceramics by the Manufacture nationale de Sèvres and contemporary ceramics by other artists
La Vallée-aux-Loups	Châtenay-Malabry	Hauts-de-Seine	Historic house	Country house of Chateaubriand

=== Rest of Île de France ===
Name	Location	Department	Type	Summary
Centre Photographique d'Île-de-France	Pontault-Combault	Seine-et-Marne	Photography	
Château de Blandy-les-Tours	Blandy-les-Tours	Seine-et-Marne	Historic house	Restored remains of the 13th-century feudal fortress manor castle
Château de Breteuil	Choisel	Yvelines	Historic house	17th-century chateau with rare portraits of Kings, 18th-century furniture, rooms with wax figures of kings and important figures created by the Musée Grévin
Château de Brie-Comte-Robert	Brie-Comte-Robert	Seine-et-Marne	Historic house	Remains of the medieval fortress castle
Château de Champs-sur-Marne	Champs-sur-Marne	Seine-et-Marne	Historic house	18th-century rococo house and gardens with links to many important figures
Château de Courances	Courances	Essonne	Historic house	Louis XIII style chateau and gardens
Château de Courson	Courson-Monteloup	Essonne	Historic house	Chateau and park with gardens
Château de Dampierre	Dampierre-en-Yvelines	Yvelines	Historic house	Renaissance castle, gardens and park
Château de Dourdan	Dourdan	Essonne	Historic house	Fortress castle, includes museum of local history
Château de Fontainebleau	Fontainebleau	Seine-et-Marne	Historic house	One of the largest French royal châteaux, residence of French monarchs from Louis VII through Napoleon III
Château de la Madeleine	Chevreuse	Yvelines	Historic house	Remains of a medieval fortress castle
Château de La Roche-Guyon	La Roche-Guyon	Val-d'Oise	Historic house	Medieval manor house and fortress
Château de Maisons	Maisons-Laffitte	Yvelines	Historic house	17th-century French baroque chateau
Château de Nemours	Ferrières-en-Brie	Seine-et-Marne	Art	Medieval castle that houses exhibitions from its art collection
Château de Rambouillet	Rambouillet	Yvelines	Historic house	Former Royal, Imperial and Presidential residence with large 50,000 acres of woods
Château de Rentilly	Bussy-Saint-Martin	Seine et Marne	Contemporary art	
Château de Thoiry	Thoiry	Yvelines	Historic house	150-hectare (370-acre) castle, wildlife park and zoo, and botanical garden
Château de Vaux-le-Vicomte	Maincy	Seine-et-Marne	Historic house	17th-century grand château and gardens
Domaine de Madame Élisabeth	Versailles	Yvelines	Historic house	House of Mme Elisabeth sister of king Louis XVI
Domaine départemental de Chamarande	Chamarande	Essonne	Contemporary art	Contemporary art exhibited in the 17th-18th c. castle and park
Domaine départemental de Méréville	Méréville	Essonne	Historic house	16th-18th castle and park (in renovation)
Maison-atelier Foujita	Villiers-le-Bâcle	Essonne	Historic house	House of the painter Leonard Foujita
Maison Jean-Cocteau	Milly-la-Forêt	Essonne	Historic house	House of the writer and artist Jean Cocteau
Musée Aeronautique et Spatial SAFRAN	Réau	Seine-et-Marne	Aerospace	History of aviation and aerospace in France, includes historic airplanes, space engines, rockets, motorcycles
Musée archéologique départemental du Val-d'Oise	Guiry-en-Vexin	Val d'Oise	Archeology	Archeology of the département, Gallo-Roman sculpture
Musée d'Argenteuil	Argenteuil	Val d'Oise	Local	Archeology, local history
Musée Bossuet	Meaux	Seine-et-Marne	Art	Art and local history and art, located in a former episcopal palace
Musée d'Archéologie Nationale	Saint-Germain-en-Laye	Yvelines	Archaeology	Located in Château de Saint-Germain-en-Laye, include finds from Paleolithic to Merovingian times
Musée d'art et d'histoire de Melun	Melun	Seine-et-Marne	Local	Art, local history, archaeological pieces, lapidary, works by sculptor Henri Chapu
Musée de la Faïence	Vulaines-sur-Seine	Seine-et-Marne	Local	Features a collection of local ceramics, exhibits of local history
Musée de la Gendarmerie Nationale	Melun	Seine-et-Marne	Military	History of the National Gendarmerie
Musée de la Grande Guerre	Meaux	Seine-et-Marne	Military	History of World War I
Musée de la Seine et Marne	Saint-Cyr-sur-Morin	Seine-et-Marne	Local	History of the département and writer Pierre Mac Orlan
Musée de la Toile de Jouy	Jouy-en-Josas	Yvelines	Textile	Located in the Chateau de l'Églantine, Toile de Jouy fabric collection, printing equipment and old drawings, period display of Christophe-Philippe Oberkampf furniture
Musée de Préhistoire d’Île-de-France	Nemours	Seine-et-Marne	Archaeology	Archaeological artifacts showing the prehistory of the area
Musée des Peintres de Barbizon	Barbizon	Seine-et-Marne	Art	Works by the Barbizon school of painters
Musée des tramways à vapeur et des chemins de fer secondaires français	Butry-sur-Oise	Val-d'Oise	Railway	Historic railway vehicles
Musée national de la Renaissance	Écouen	Val-d'Oise	Decorative arts	Located in the 16th-century Château d'Écouen, houses Renaissance decorative art from the Musée national du Moyen Âge
Musée départemental Maurice Denis "The Priory"	Saint-Germain-en-Laye	Yvelines	Art	Focus is Nabi art
Musée Espace Gaïa	Vulaines-sur-Seine	Seine-et-Marne	Natural history	Area geology and paleontology, located in the Medieval Priory St. Martin
Musée Fournaise	Chatou	Yvelines	Art	Restaurant location on the Seine that inspired many Impressionist painters, includes art and writings inspired by the river
Musée Français de la Photographie	Bièvres	Essonne	Photography	Photography
Musée Gatien-Bonnet	Lagny-sur-Marne	Seine-et-Marne	Local	History of the town, archeology, neo-impressionnist paintings
Musée Henri Chapu	Le Mée-sur-Seine	Seine-et-Marne	Art	Works by sculptor Henri Chapu
Musée Jardin Bourdelle	Égreville	Seine-et-Marne	Art	Features over 50 outdoor bronze sculptures by Antoine Bourdelle in a garden setting
Musée Jean-Jacques Rousseau	Montmorency	Val d'Oise	Historic house	House of the philosopher from 1757 to 1762, manuscripts and memorabilia
Musée Lambinet	Versailles	Yvelines	Local	History of the town, includes some rooms with period decor and the town's collection of decorative arts from the 15th to 20th centuries, and paintings, sculptures and other works of art by artists from the town
Musée Louis Braille	Coupvray	Seine-et-Marne	Historic house	Birthplace home depicting life of Louis Braille, educator and inventor of a system of reading and writing for use by the blind or visually impaired
Musée Louis Senlecq	L'Isle-Adam	Seine et Marne	Art and history	Paintings, sculptures, décorative arts, local history
Musée national de Port-Royal des Champs	Magny-les-Hameaux	Yvelines	Art	17th and 18th-century art and engravings, remains of the medieval abbey of Cistercian nuns
Museum of Provins	Provins	Seine-et-Marne	Local	Local history, located in a 13th-century house
Musée Robert-Dubois-Corneau	Brunoy	Essonne	Local	History of the town, art of thé 18th c., actor Talma
Musée Stéphane Mallarmé	Vulaines-sur-Seine	Seine-et-Marne	Historic house	House of poet Stéphane Mallarmé, his works and those of his artist friends
Musée Utrillo-Valadon	Sannois	Val-d'Oise	Art	Art exhibitions, features works by Maurice Utrillo, Suzanne Valadon (his mother) and André Utter (his stepfather)
Palace of Versailles	Versailles	Yvelines	Historic house	Royal palace of Louis XIV with many buildings, gardens, Museum of the History of France
Tour César (fr)	Provins	Seine-et-Marne	Historic site	Medieval fortress tower
Union Nationale des collectionneurs de Véhicules Militaires	Versailles	Yvelines	Military	Collection of historic military vehicles, some of which were involved in the Liberation of Paris. Also includes prototype vehicles for the Aérotrain.
Villa Savoye	Poissy	Yvelines	Historic house	1930s modernist villa designed by Le Corbusier and his cousin Pierre Jeanneret

== Defunct museums ==
=== Paris ===
Name	Closure	Summary
Centre de la Mer et des Eaux	2010	
Musée Arménien de France	1995	Closed until compliance to security norms
Musée Bouilhet-Christofle	2008	
Musée Bouchard	2007	Collections moved to the Musée de La Piscine in Roubaix
Musée Dapper	2017	
Musée d'Anatomie Delmas-Orfila-Rouvière	2005	Collections moved to the University of Montpellier
Musée d'Art Juif	1998	Collections moved to the Musée d'Art et d'Histoire du Judaïsme
Musée d'Ethnographie du Trocadéro	1935	Collections moved to the Musée de l'Homme and the Musée national des Arts et Traditions Populaires
Musée de l'Assistance Publique - Hôpitaux de Paris	2012	(VP premises), evaluating reopening at the Hôtel Dieu
Musée de l'Holographie	1996	
Musée de la mode et du textile	1997	Now a department of the Musée des Arts Décoratifs
Musée de la Poupée	2017	
Musée de la Publicité	1999	Now a department of the Musée des Arts Décoratifs
Musée de la Serrure	2003	
Musée de Notre Dame de Paris	2008	
Musée de Radio France	2007	Collections stored
Musée des Lettres et Manuscrits	2014	
Musée des Matériaux du Centre de Recherche sur les Monuments Historiques	2007 ?	Now a department of the Centre de recherches sur les Monuments historiques reserved to the students of the School of Chaillot (fr) at the Cité de l'Architecture et du Patrimoine
Musée du Montparnasse	2015	(VP premises), replaced by the Villa Vassilieff art center
Musée Dupuytren	2016	Collections moved to the Pierre and Marie Curie University
Musée Grévin – Forum des Halles	1996	Collections moved back to the Musée Grévin
Musée Lenine	2007	
Musée national Hébert	2004	Closed for renovation operated by the Musée d'Orsay
Musée National du Sport	2013	Collections moved to Nice
Musée national des Arts d'Afrique et d'Océanie	2003	Collections moved to the Musée du quai Branly
Musée national des Arts et Traditions Populaires (France)	2005	Collections moved to the Museum of European and Mediterranean Civilisations in Marseille
Musée-Galerie de la Seita	2000	Half of the collection given to the Musée du Tabac in Bergerac
Musée-Placard d'Erik Satie	2008	
La Maison Rouge	2018	
Pavillon des Arts	2006	(VP premises)
Pinacothèque de Paris	2016	
Revue virtuelle	1996	

=== Paris région ===
- Musée Rosa Bonheur, premises mostly sold by the city in 2014
- Musée d’art naïf de Vicq en Île-de-France, closed in 2014

== See also ==
- List of visitor attractions in Paris
- List of museums in France
