= Musée Adzak =

Art museum in Paris, France

Coordinates: 48°49′49″N 2°18′51″E

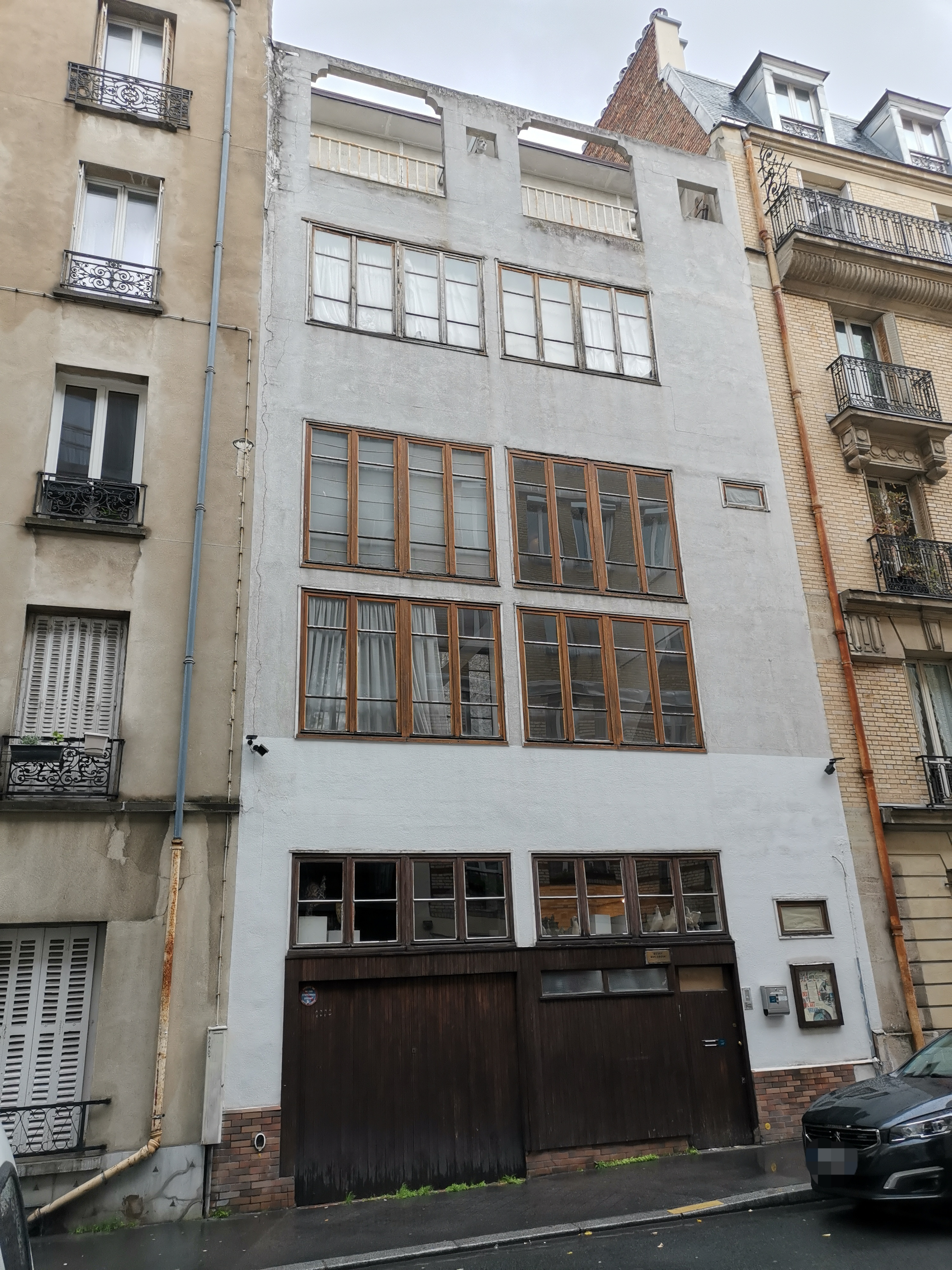
- Established: 1987; 39 years ago
- Location: Paris, France
- Founder: Roy Adzak
- Website: en.parisinfo.com/museum-monuments/1/musee-adzak

Musée Adzak, also known as Adzak–Espace d'Art International, is an art museum located at 3, rue Jonquoy, Paris, France. It is located in the Plaisance District, in the southern part of 14th arrondissement. The nearest Paris Métro stop is Plaisance on Line 13.

The museum is in the former atelier built by British photographer and sculptor Roy Adzak (1927–1987), who was born Royston Wright. The studio exhibits paintings, sculpture, and photography by a wide range of artists, and encourages international meetings and dialogue in its space.

== See also ==
- List of museums in Paris
