= Pavillon de l'Arsenal =

Museum and center for urban planning in Paris, France

Coordinates: 48°51′2″N 2°21′44″E

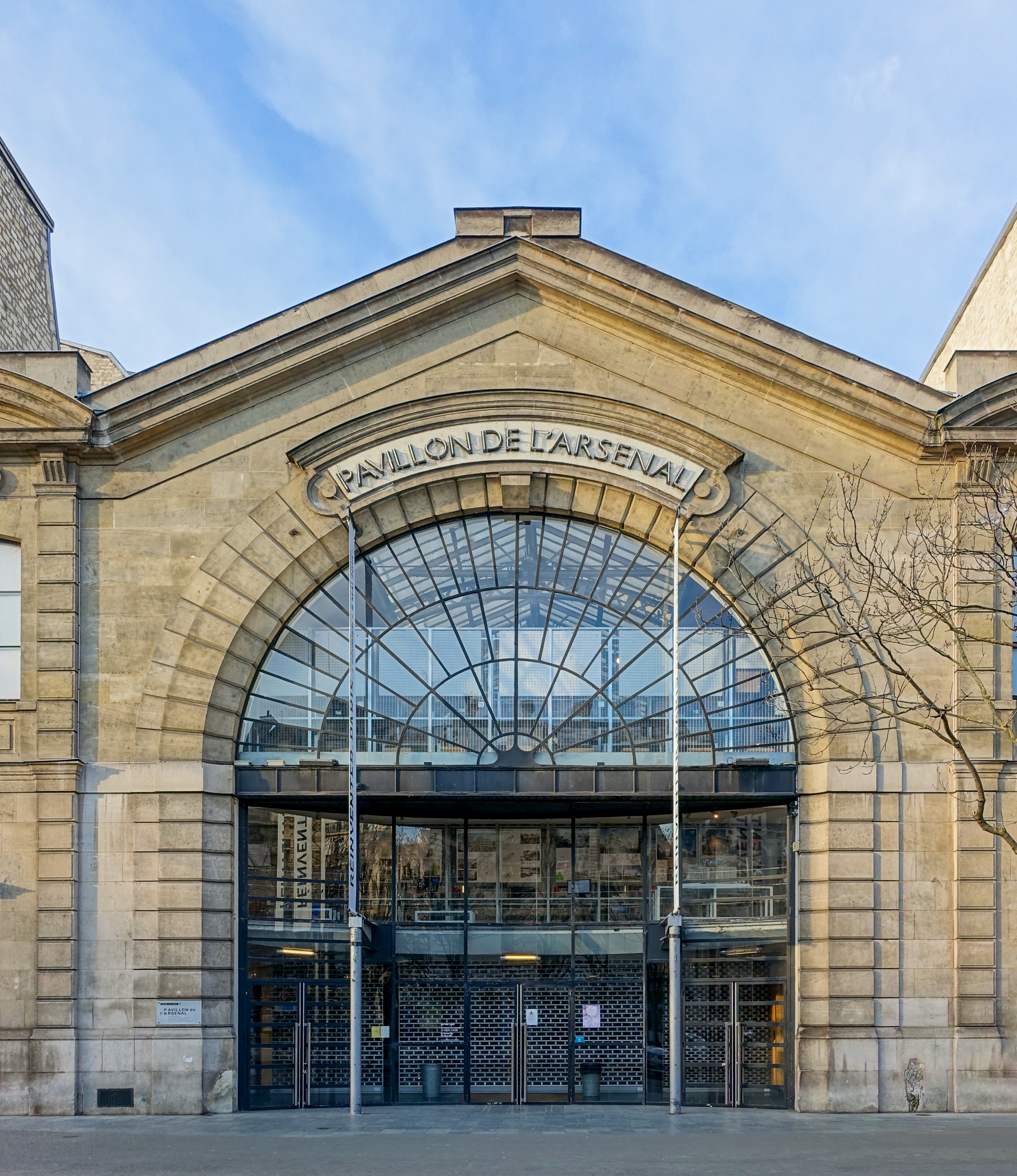
Pavillon de l'Arsenal

The Pavillon de l'Arsenal (French pronunciation: [pavijɔ̃ də laʁsənal]) is the Paris Center for architecture and urbanism, a center for urban planning and museum located in the 4th arrondissement at 21, boulevard Morland, Paris, France. It is open daily except Mondays; admission is free.

The museum building was built in 1878―1879 for Laurent-Louis Borniche, wood merchant and amateur painter, near the former site of a Celestine monastic community turned arsenal. In 1988, it became a center for documentation and exhibitions related to urban planning and the architecture of Paris.

Today the museum's activities include operating its exhibitions, publishing reference books on issues related to the daily life of Parisians, and providing a forum for individuals and authorities involved in the city's urban planning. Its permanent exhibit (800 m^{2}) displays Parisian architecture and shows how the city has evolved. Three additional spaces are used for temporary exhibits on topics including housing in Paris, the Paris of Baron Haussmann and of private homes, projects for Paris 2012, and other aspects of French and international architecture.

== See also ==
- List of museums in Paris
