= International Tennis Hall of Fame =

Museum and tennis venue in Rhode Island, US

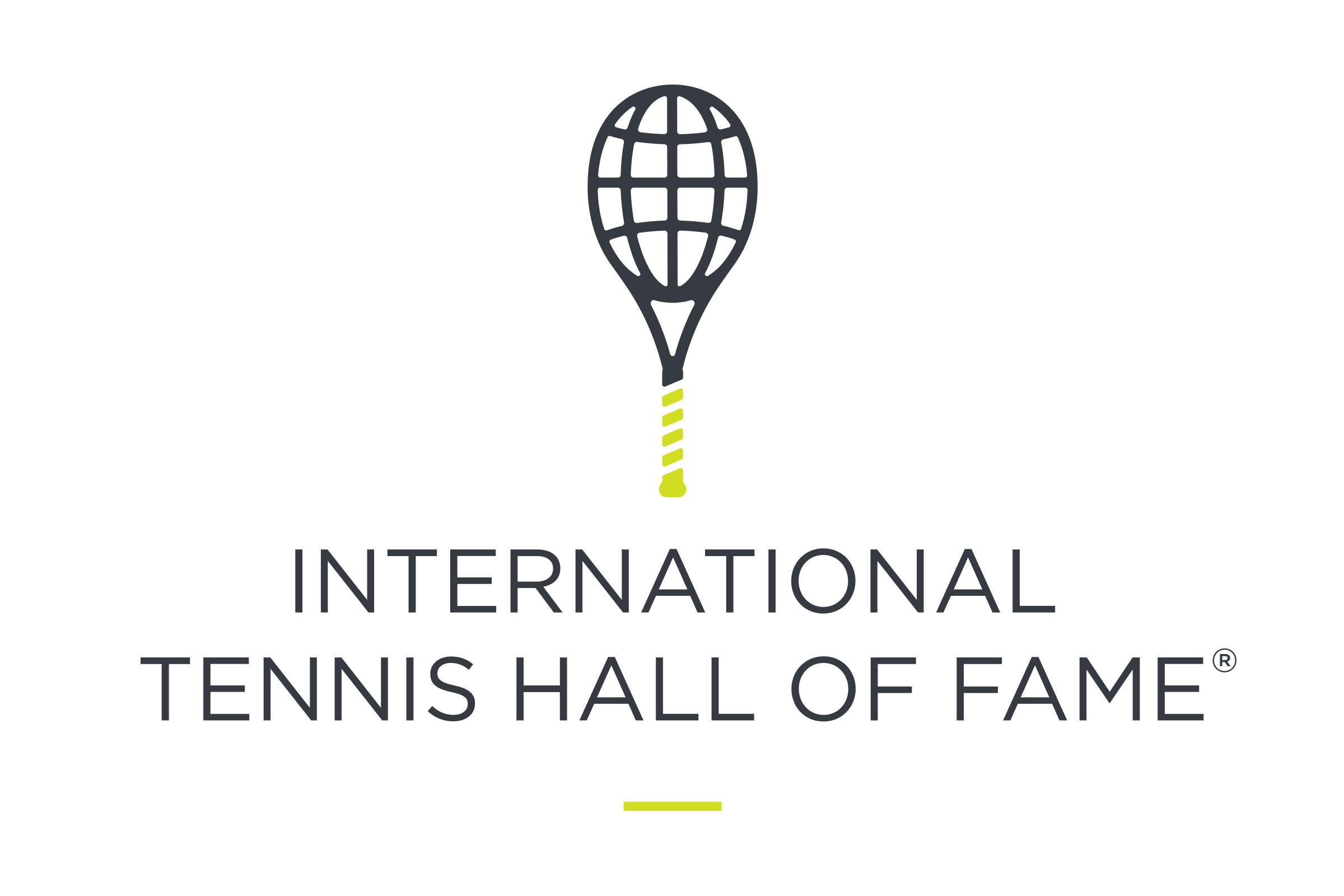
- Established: 1880; 146 years ago 1954; 72 years ago (Hall of fame and museum)
- Location: Newport, Rhode Island
- Coordinates: 41.4828°N 71.3082°W
- Type: Professional sports hall of fame; museum; National Historic Landmark; tennis club; court tennis club; tennis tournament venue
- Accreditation: American Alliance of Museums
- Founder: James J. Van Alen
- President: Patrick McEnroe
- CEO: Dan Faber
- Public transit access: RIPTA
- Website: tennisfame.com

The International Tennis Hall of Fame is located in Newport, Rhode Island, United States. It honors both players and other contributors to the sport of tennis. The complex, the former Newport Casino, includes a museum, 13 grass tennis courts, an indoor tennis facility with three courts, three outdoor hard courts, one green clay court, a court tennis facility, and a theatre. The International Tennis Hall of Fame is a non-profit organization with the goal of preserving, celebrating, and inspiring the sport of tennis around the world.

The location was the original home of the U.S. National Championships (now called the US Open), established in 1881. Since 1976, the complex has hosted the Hall of Fame Open, a men's event, each year in July, with a women’s event added since 2025.

== History ==
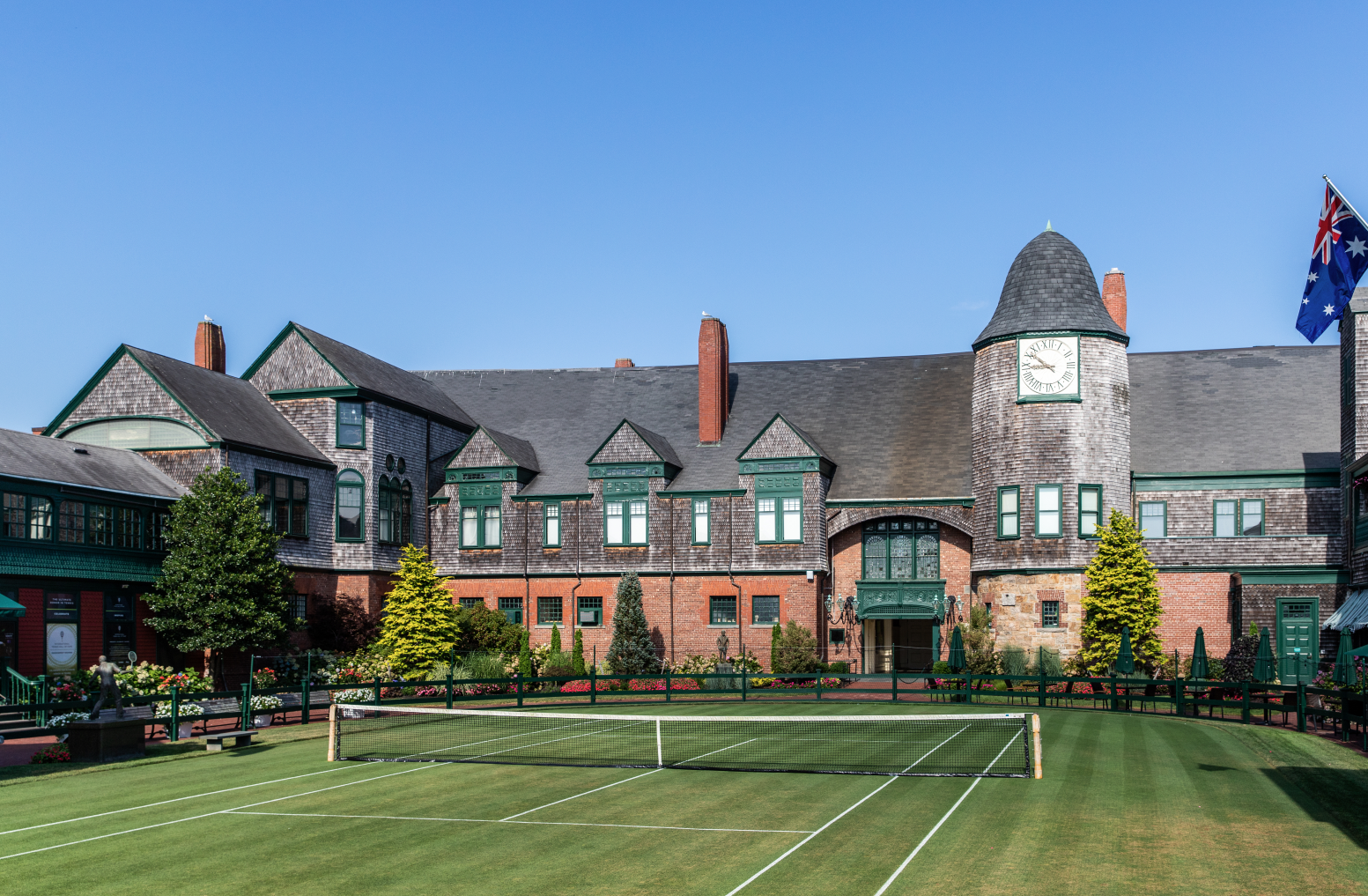
The inner courtyard, horseshoe court, and clocktower of the Newport Casino, home to the International Tennis Hall of Fame.

The hall of fame and museum are located in the Newport Casino, which was commissioned in 1879 by James Gordon Bennett Jr. as part of an exclusive resort for wealthy Newport summer residents. It was designed by Charles McKim along with Stanford White, who did the interiors. It is an example of Victorian Shingle Style architecture. In 1881, the Real Tennis Court (housing the National Tennis Club) and the Casino Theatre were constructed at the east end of the campus. The club was opened on July 1, 1880, after a six-month construction period and quickly became a fashionable venue for Newport summer residents.

The United States Lawn Tennis Association held its first championships at the Newport Casino in 1881. The event was held annually through 1914, by which time tennis had become the key attraction at the resort. The championship was suspended during World War I.

But by the 1950s, the retreat was struggling financially, as tourism preferences changed. It was at risk of being demolished for redevelopment of modern retail space, but the building was purchased and saved by Jimmy and Candy Van Alen, wealthy Newport summer residents. A sportsman himself, in 1954, Jimmy Van Alen established the National Lawn Tennis Hall of Fame and Museum in the Casino. The combination of tennis matches and the museum allowed the building to be saved.

Van Alen intended the facility to be "a shrine to the ideals of the game", and was elected president of the hall in 1957. The National Lawn Tennis Hall of Fame was officially sanctioned by the United States Tennis Association upon its founding in 1954. In 1976, the organization became the International Tennis Hall of Fame. It was recognized by the International Tennis Federation in 1986. The first Hall of Fame members were inducted in 1955; as of 2023, a total of 262 inductees from 27 countries have been recognized.

In 2015, Martina Hingis was appointed as the first Global Ambassador for the International Tennis Hall of Fame. In 2016, Guga Kuerten was appointed a Global Ambassador, and in 2017 Michael Chang was appointed a Global Ambassador.

The current Board of Governors includes former professional tennis players Kim Clijsters (Honorary President), Patrick McEnroe (President), Gigi Fernández, Katrina Adams, and Vijay Amritraj.

== Museum ==
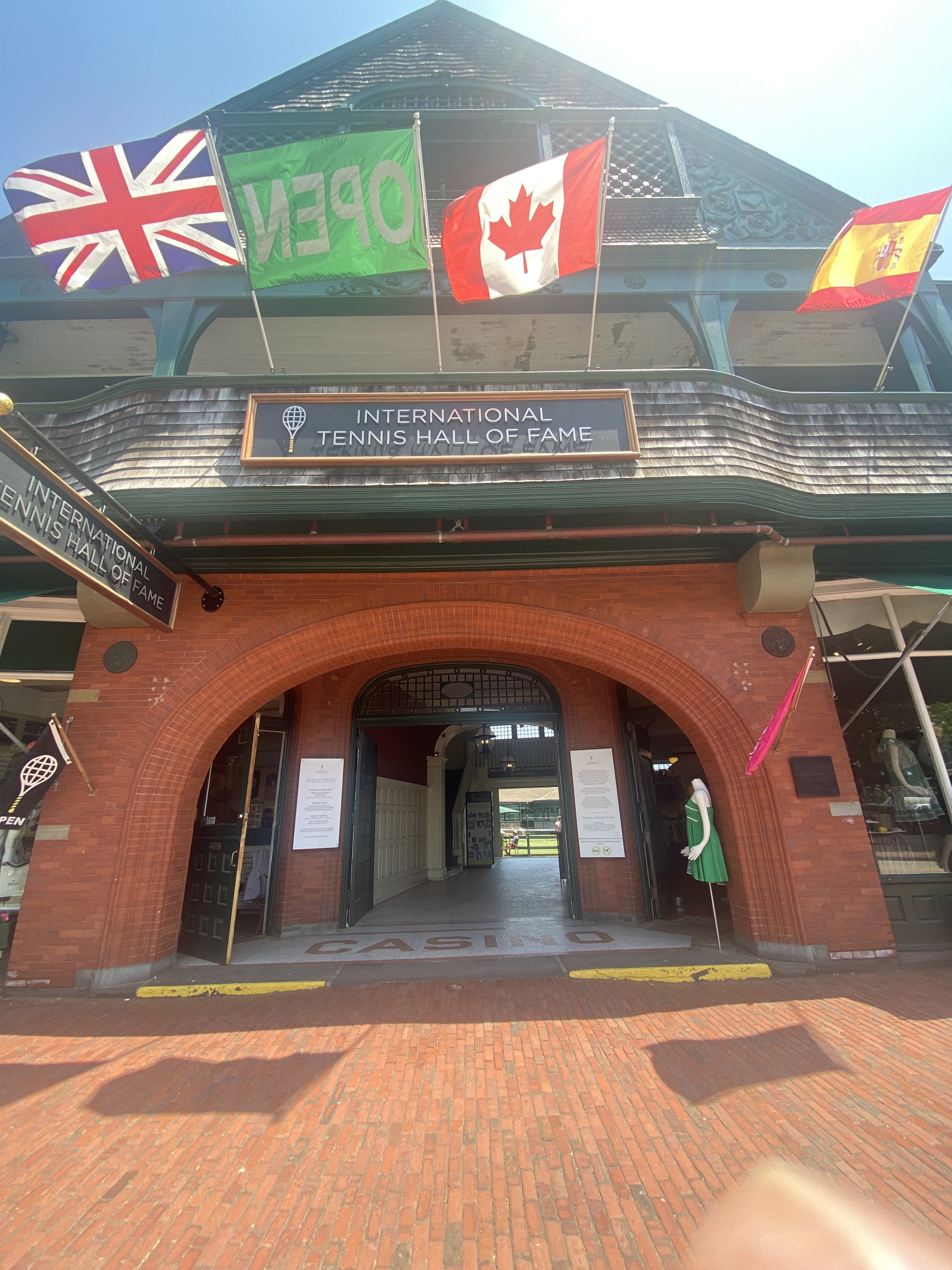
Hall of Fame entrance on Bellevue Ave.

The museum chronicles the history of the sport from the 12th century through the modern day. The museum's permanent collection contains approximately 30,000 objects, including modern and historic tennis equipment, fine art, decorative arts, artifacts from Hall of Famers and other significant figures within the sport, trophies, textiles and clothing, ephemera, and furnishings. The museum's Information Research Center (IRC) houses 5,000 books, 3,000+ audio-visual materials, 1 million plus photographic images, and a comprehensive collection of magazines, programs, periodicals, blueprints and archival materials. The collection is displayed year-round in the museum's 13,000 square feet (1,200 m^{2}) of exhibit space. The museum also offers several digital exhibits.

=== 2015 renovation ===
The museum reopened in May 2015 following a nearly complete renovation of its exhibition spaces. The redesigned and reinterpreted galleries encompass more than 12,000 square feet of interactive exhibits, videos, and approximately 2,000 artifacts related to tennis' history and champions past and present.

The museum was initially accredited by the American Alliance of Museums in 2013, and subsequently reaccredited in 2022. The museum became a Smithsonian Affiliate in 2017. The museum is also a partner of the Google Arts & Culture initiative.

=== 2025 renovation ===
In May 2025, the museum unveiled a new look after an extensive $3 million renovation. Old exhibits were updated, interactive exhibits were added, and a new "Hall of Famers Gallery" was introduced. The HOF Gallery features a cast metal racquet representing each of the 270 Hall of Fame inductees.

== Awards ==
For a description of each award and a list of its recipients, see footnote

- Chairman's Award
- Davis Cup Award of Excellence
- Eugene L. Scott Award
- Fed Cup Award of Excellence
- Golden Achievement Award
- Joseph F. Cullman 3rd Award
- Samuel Hardy Award
- Tennis Educational Merit Award

== Hall of Fame Open ==
The Hall of Fame hosts several tournaments, including the Hall of Fame Open in July. The Hall of Fame Open is a part of the US Open Series, as well as being part of the men's ATP World Tour, the tournament is the only grass court event in North America. Top male players come to Newport directly from Wimbledon to compete for the Van Alen Cup at the International Tennis Hall of Fame. Past champions include Americans John Isner (4× Hall of Fame Open Champion) and Mardy Fish, two-time champion Fabrice Santoro of France, and Australia's Lleyton Hewitt. During the tournament, Tennis Hall of Famers are officially inducted in front of family, friends, fans, and fellow members of the Tennis Hall of Fame.

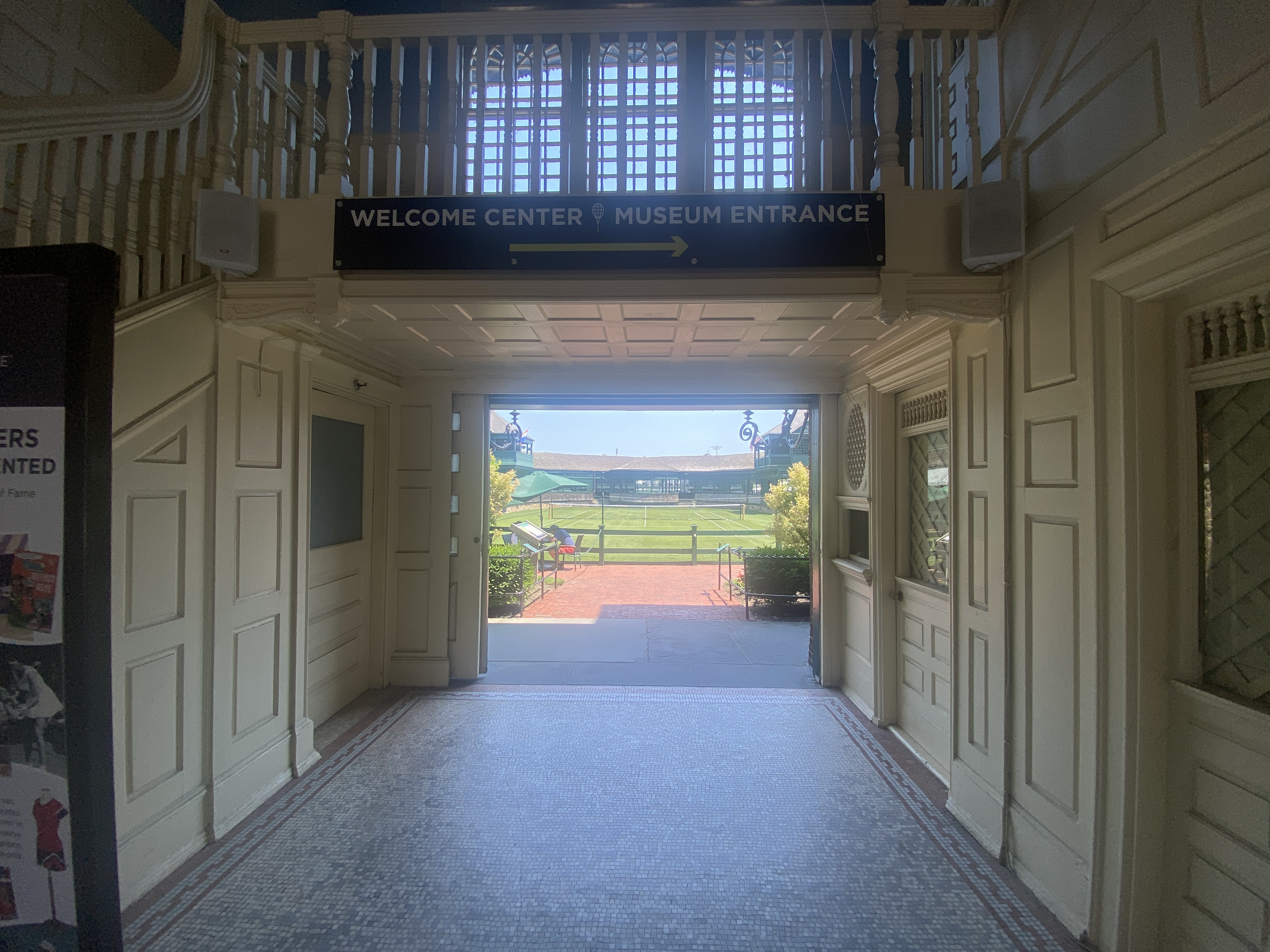
International Tennis Hall of Fame

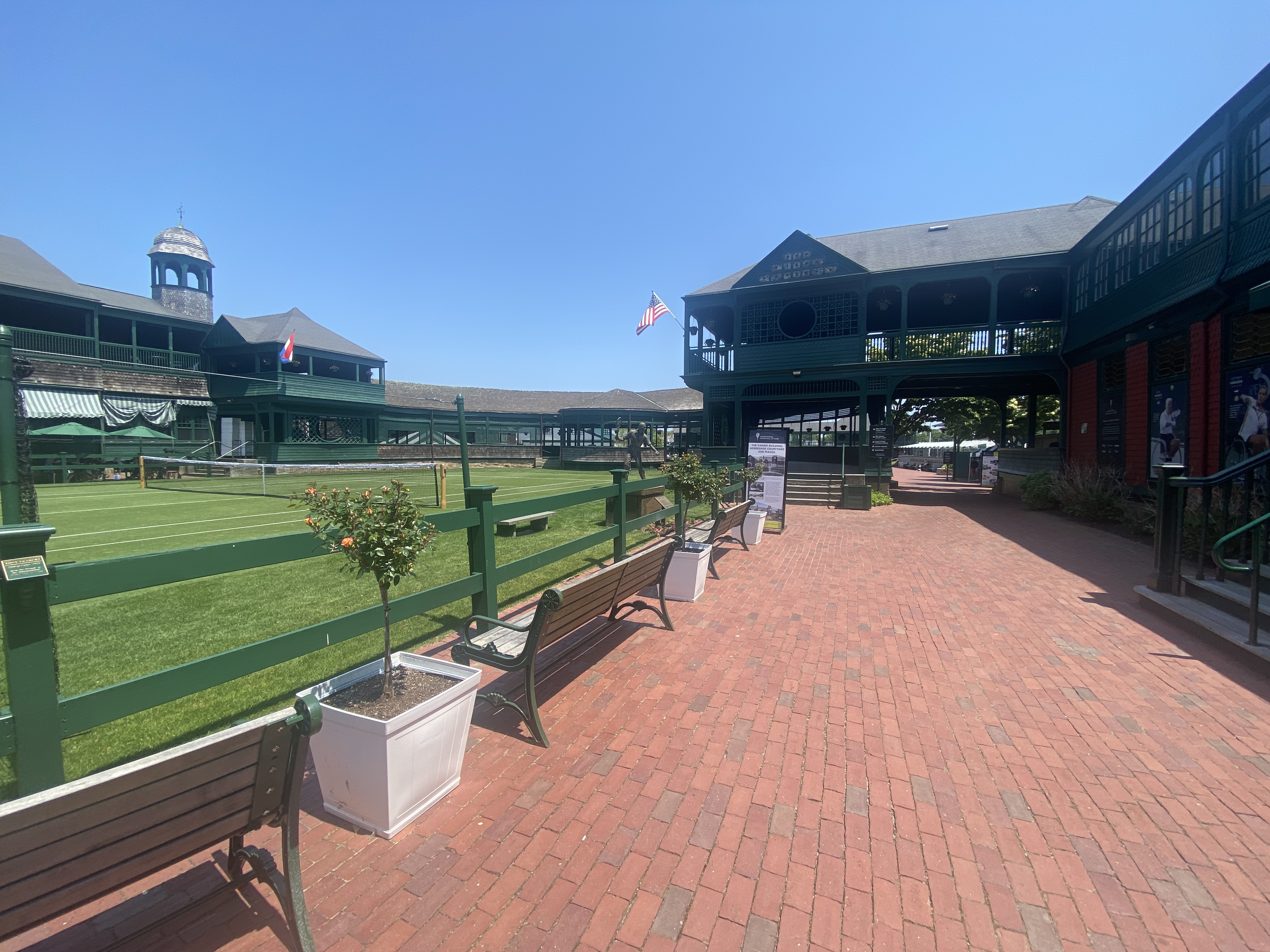
International Tennis Hall of Fame

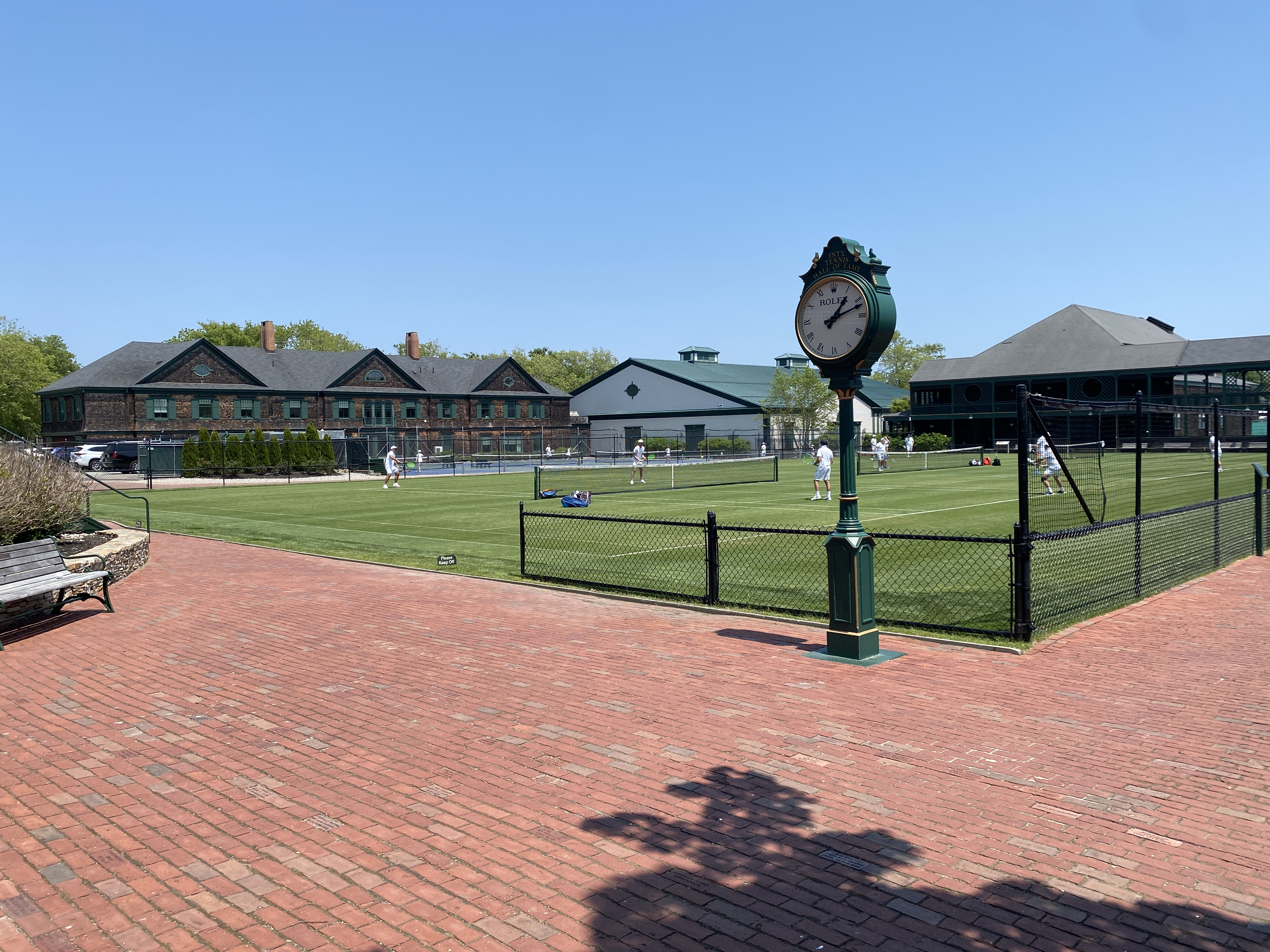
Front Lawn courts with indoor tennis club and outdoor hard courts in background.

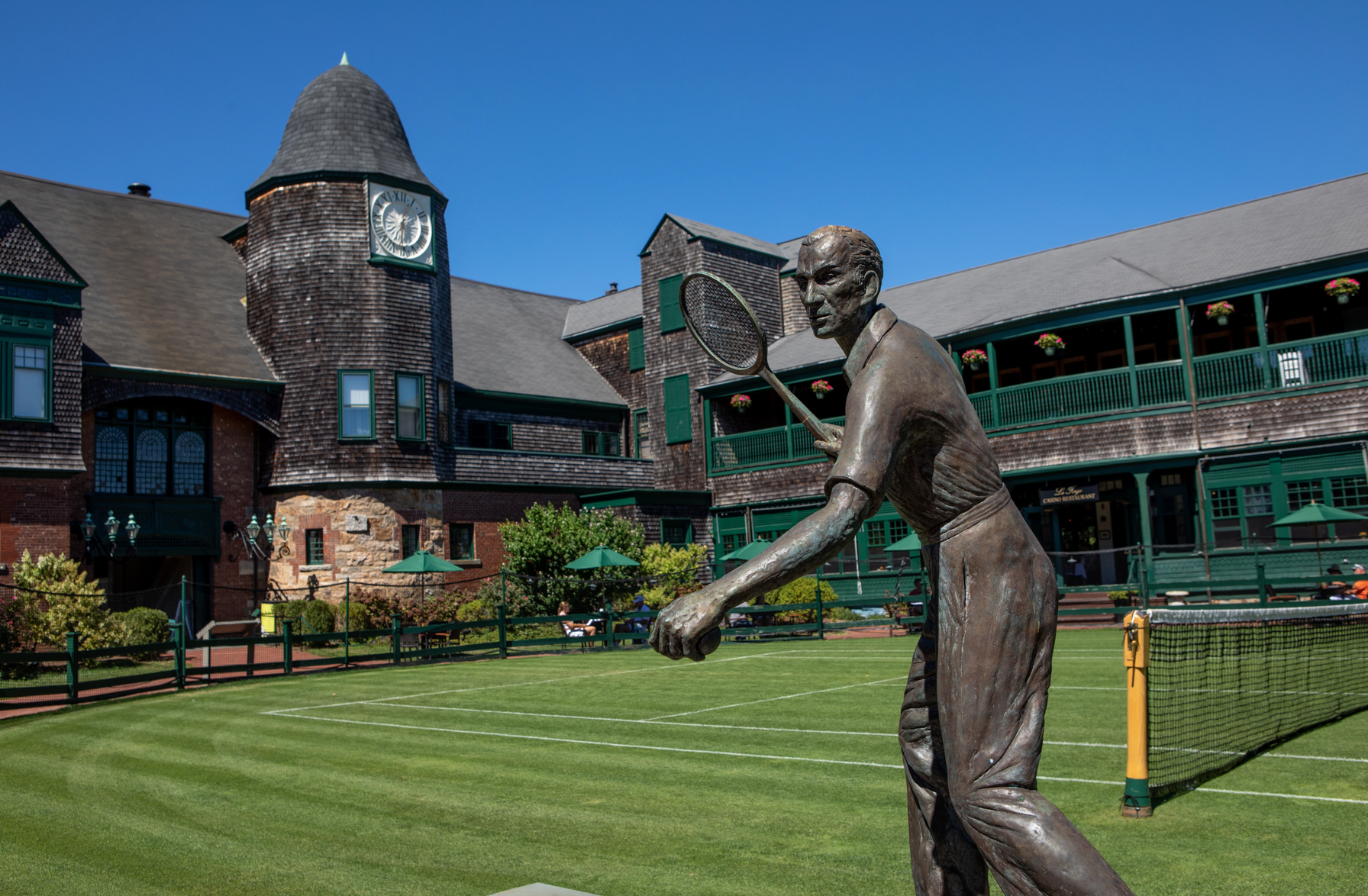
International Tennis Hall of Fame (Fred Perry sculpture in foreground)

== Members ==
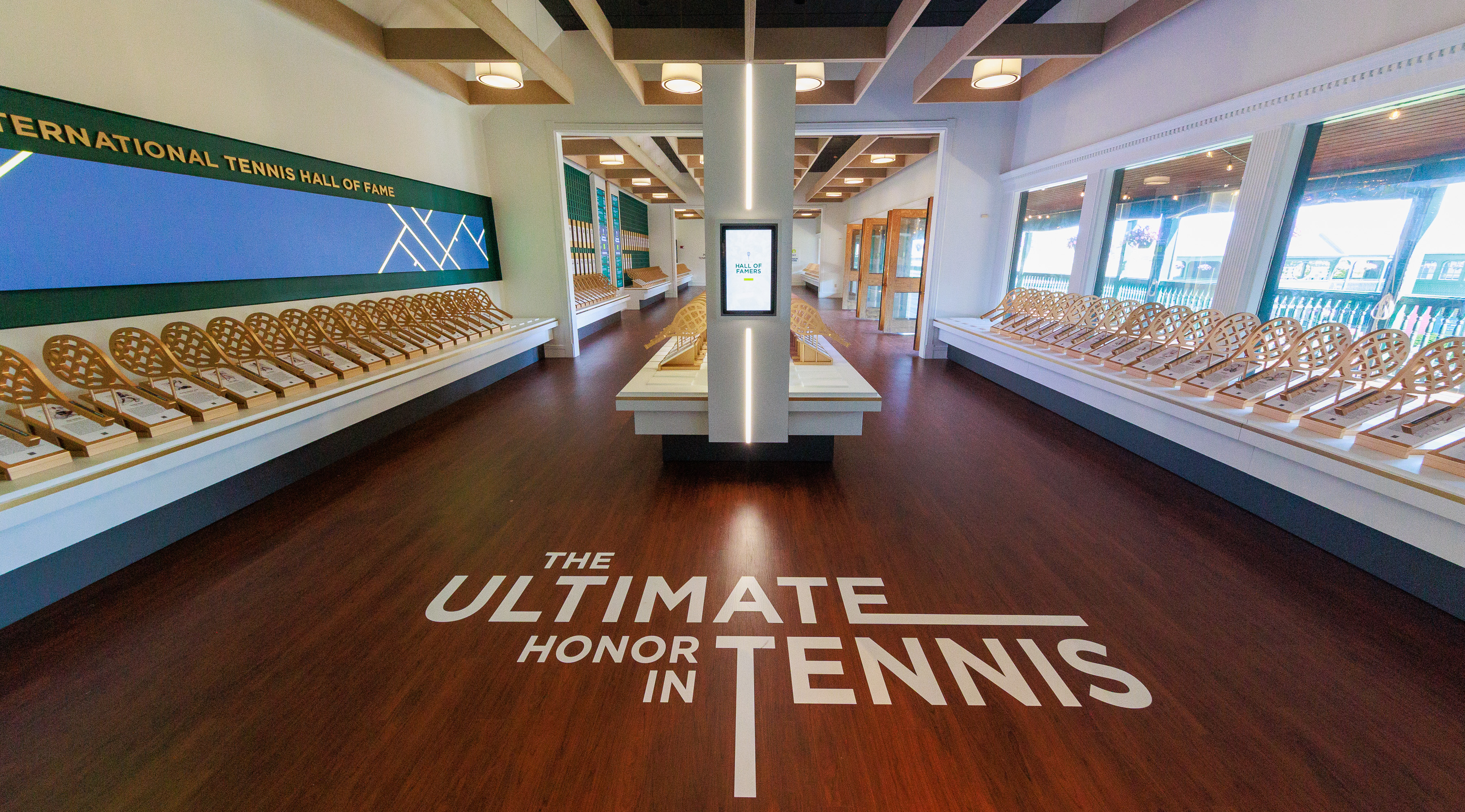
Hall of Famers Gallery

Being inducted into the Tennis Hall of Fame is considered the ultimate honor in tennis. It represents the sum of one's achievements and contributions as being among the most important and transformative in tennis history.

There is a seven-step process to be inducted into the Tennis Hall of Fame. A player or contributor must be nominated to be inducted, and then the national enshrinement committee reviews their eligibility. Once it is decided if they are eligible, the committee reviews if the nominee will be considered by voters. After review, the voting begins; both group and fan voting takes place. A nominee must receive at least 75% from the Official Voting Group result or a combined total of 75% or more from the Official Voting Group result and any bonus percentage points they earn through the Fan Vote. Votes are tallied by an independent accounting firm. The class induction is announced in January, and the new class is inducted into the Tennis Hall of Fame in July at the International Tennis Hall of Fame.

In addition to contributors, players are divided into three categories: Masters Players, Players, and Recent Players. Additionally, Wheelchair Tennis have their own subcategory in Players as well.

== Global Ambassador ==
Three players have been named "Global Ambassadors" for the Hall of Fame:

Name	Nationality	Year appointed	Ref.
Hingis, Martina	Switzerland	2015	
Kuerten, Gustavo	Brazil	2016	
Chang, Michael	USA	2017	

== See also ==
- Tenniseum
- List of sports awards honoring women
