= Musée des Matériaux du Centre de Recherche sur les Monuments Historiques =

French museum

Coordinates: 48°51′45″N 2°17′15″E

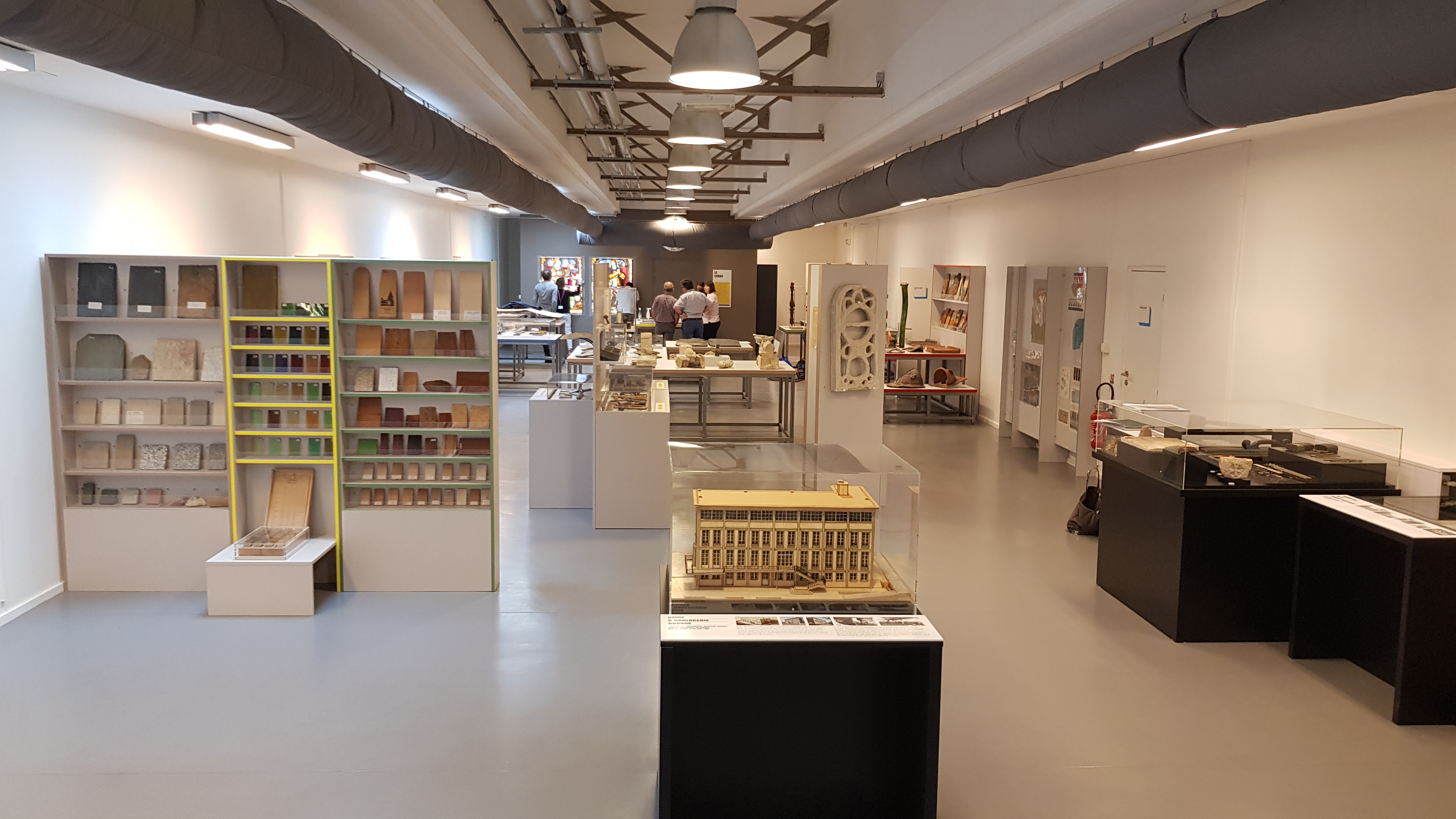

The Musée des Matériaux du Centre de Recherche sur les Monuments Historiques was a museum in the Palais de Chaillot at 9, avenue Albert de Mun, Paris, France, that displayed building materials used in historical monuments along with scale models of buildings. According to Museums of the World: Handbook of International Documentation and Information and the International directory of arts, it no longer exists.

== See also ==
- List of museums in Paris
- Cité de l'Architecture et du Patrimoine
