= Musée du Fumeur =

Museum in France

Coordinates: 48°51′31″N 2°22′56″E

The Musée du Fumeur (French pronunciation: [myze dy fymœʁ], Smoking Museum) is a private museum of smoking located in the 11th arrondissement of Paris at 7 rue Pache, Paris, France. This is a museum founded in 2001 by Michka Seeliger-Chatelain and Tigrane Hadengue. It is open daily except Monday; an admission fee is charged. The nearest métro station is Voltaire.

The museum is located within a 650-square-foot (60 m^{2}) storefront, and contains a collection of smoking objects including European pipes, 17th century clay pipes, Native American ceremonial pipes, hookahs, Chinese opium pipes, Egyptian sheeshas, and snuffboxes, as well as cigars, tobacco samples, hemp-fiber clothing, and etchings, portraits, photographs, videos, and scientific drawings of tobacco plants.

== See also ==
- Musée-Galerie de la Seita
- List of museums in Paris
- Cannabis Museums
