= Musée de l'Assistance Publique – Hôpitaux de Paris =

Museum in Paris, France

Coordinates: 48°51′2″N 2°21′7″E

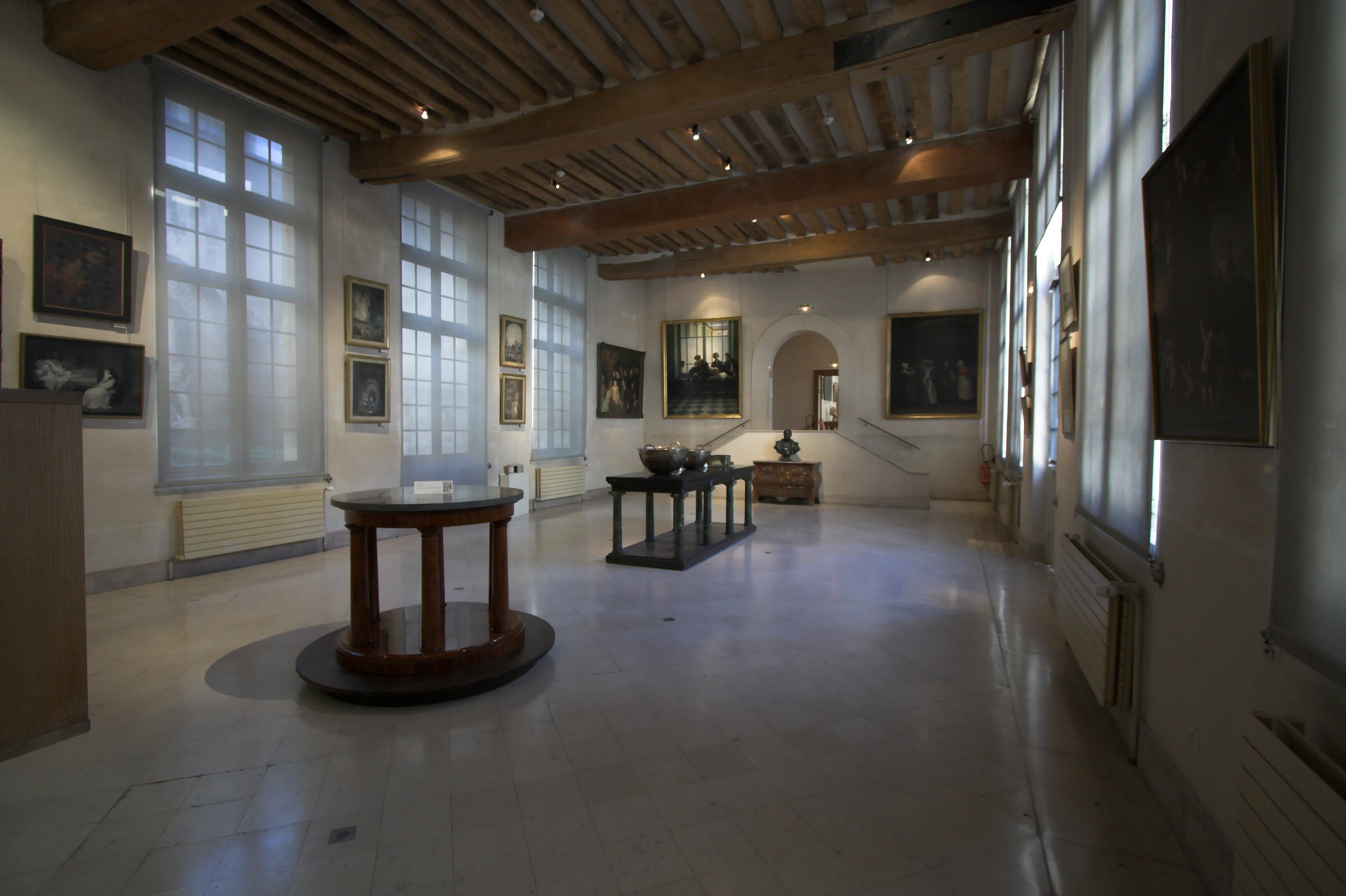
Musée de l'Assistance Publique - Hôpitaux de Paris

The Musée de l'Assistance Publique – Hôpitaux de Paris (French pronunciation: [myze də lasistɑ̃s pyblik opito də paʁi], Museum of Public Assistance–Paris Hospitals) is a museum dedicated to the history of Parisian hospitals. It is located on the left bank of the Seine in the 5th arrondissement, at 47, quai de la Tournelle, Paris, France. The museum closed in 2012 and is evaluating reopening.

The nearest Paris Métro station is Maubert-Mutualité on Line 10.

The museum was housed in the Hôtel de Miramion, attributed to architect François Mansart, which was built as a private mansion for Christopher Martin in about 1630. The building became a Catholic school for girls from 1675 to 1794, then, during the First Empire, it was converted into the central pharmacy for hospitals in Paris, which operated from 1812 until 1974. The museum was established in 1934 by the municipal authority, Assistance Publique - Hôpitaux de Paris.

The museum contained a broad collection of nearly 10,000 objects related to the history of Parisian hospitals from the Middle Ages to the present day. Objects held include French and Flemish paintings, furniture from the 17th and 18th centuries, a major collection of pharmaceutical faiences, textiles, and medical instruments. About 8% of these items are presented in permanent exhibits, with rotating temporary exhibits that include loans from other museums. In 2002, an apothecary garden of 65 medicinal plants was created in the museum's courtyard.

== See also ==
- List of museums in Paris
- Musée d'Art Dentaire Pierre Fauchard
