= Musée des Plans-Reliefs =

Museum in Paris, France

Coordinates: 48°51′23″N 2°18′48″E

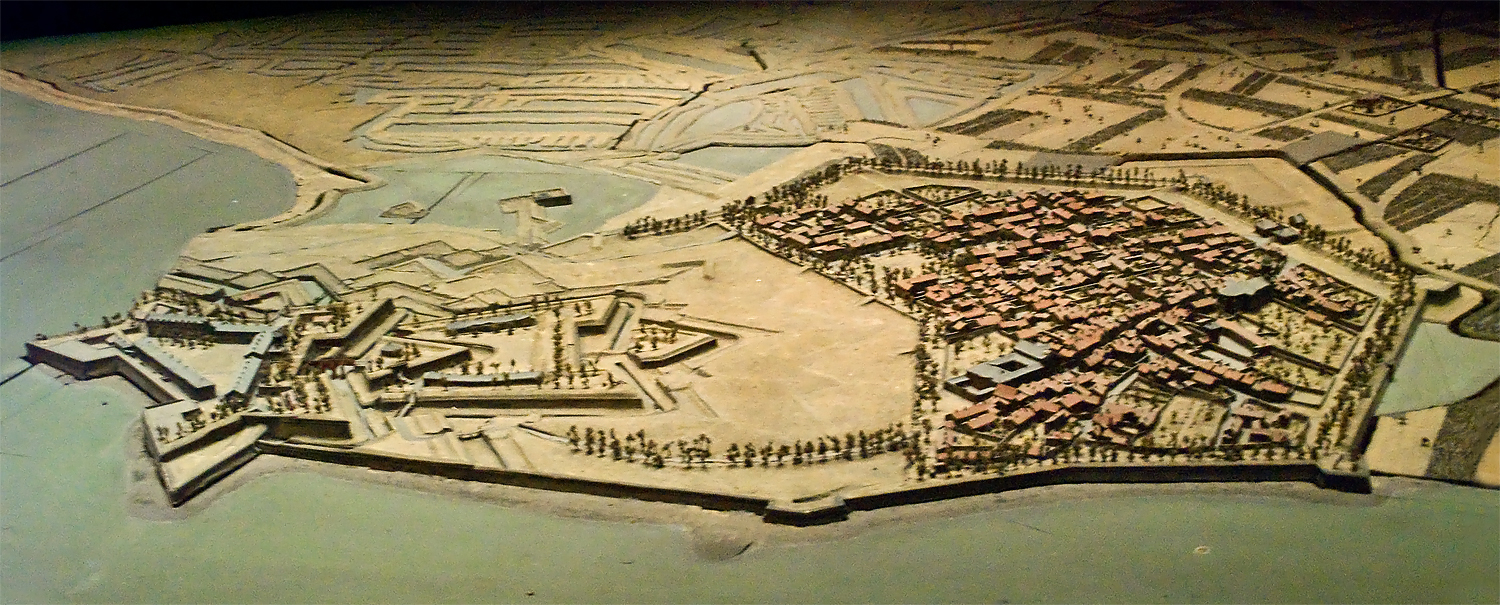
1703 model of Château-d'Oléron in the museum

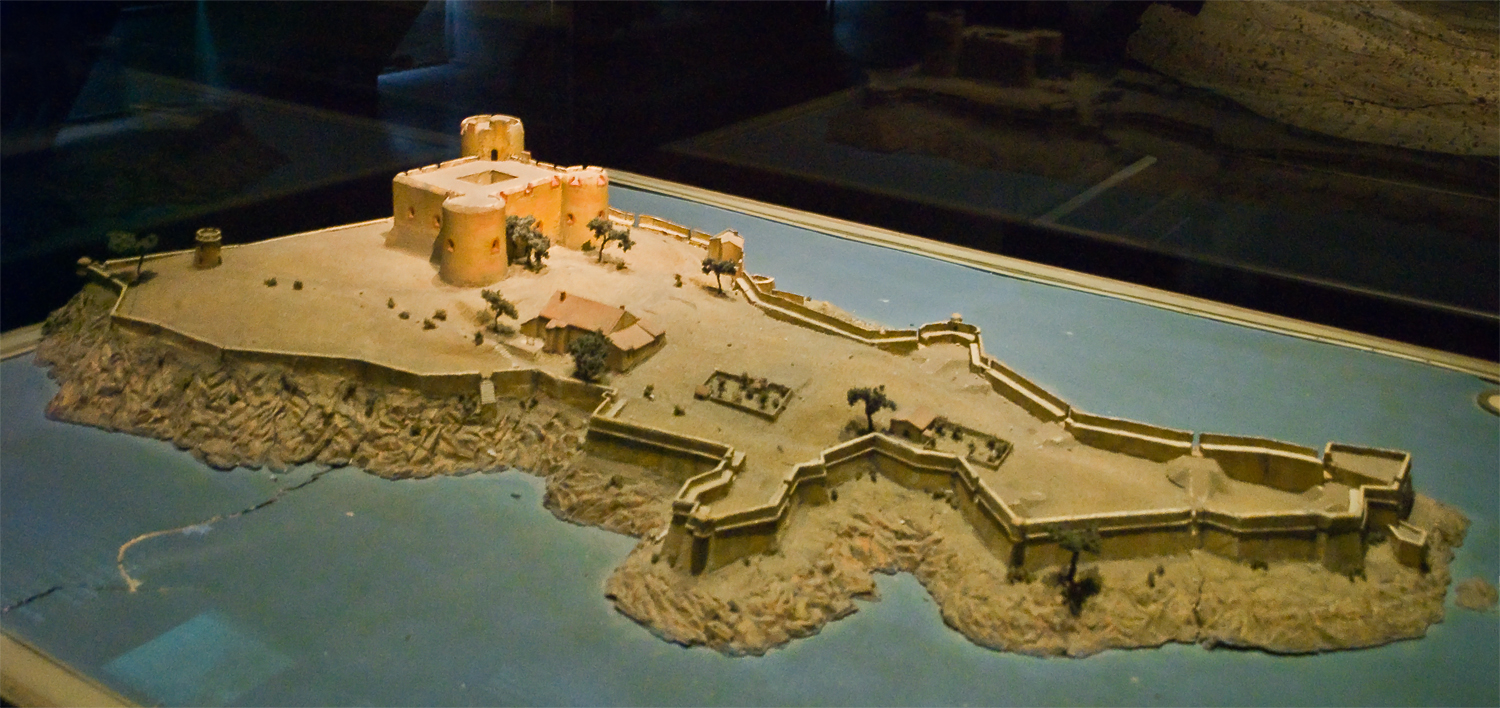
1681 model of Château d'If

The Musée des Plans-Reliefs (French pronunciation: [myze de plɑ̃ ʁəljɛf]) is a museum of military models located within the Hôtel des Invalides in the 7th arrondissement of Paris, France.

The construction of models dates to 1668, when François-Michel le Tellier, Marquis de Louvois and minister of war to Louis XIV, began a collection of three-dimensional models of fortified cities for military purposes, known as 'plans-relief'. The models gave particular attention to the city fortifications and topographic features such as hills and harbors. In 1700, Louis XIV installed the collection in the Louvre. Initially the models were constructed in the field, by military engineers, but in 1743, two central workshops were established for their construction in Béthune and Lille. A large number of models were built during and after the War of the Austrian Succession (1741–1748) to represent newly captured sites. The collection was updated in 1754, but then fell into some disuse; the final models built under the Ancien Régime were those of Saint-Omer (1758), and the fort Saint-Philippe aux Baléares (1759).

In 1774, the collection was nearly destroyed when its Louvre gallery was rededicated to paintings, but was in 1777, moved to the Hôtel des Invalides where it remains to this day. Under Napoleon, a new set of models was built, including Luxembourg (1802), La Spezia (1811), Brest (1811), and Cherbourg (1811–1813). In 1814, 17 models mainly of German cities were taken to Berlin. Some were replaced and their production then continued until about 1870, when it drew to a close with the disappearance of fortifications bastionnées. The collection was declared a historical monument in 1927, and the museum established in 1943.

All told, some 260 plans-reliefs were created between 1668 and 1870, representing about 150 fortified sites. Today, 112 models are conserved by this museum, of which 15 are kept in the Musée des Beaux-Arts de Lille. Additional models among those taken by the Prussians were later given to the cities of Strasbourg and Landau in der Pfalz. At present, the museum displays 28 plans-reliefs of fortifications along the English Channel, the Atlantic and Mediterranean coasts, and the Pyrenees. It also contains presentations on construction and use of the plans-reliefs.

In 2012, part of the museum's collections were presented at the Grand Palais, as part of the exhibition La France en relief: masterpieces from the collection of relief plans from Louis XIV to Napoleon III, from January 18 as of February 17, 2012.

The museum is open daily except the first Monday of each month; an admission fee is charged.

== See also ==
- List of museums in Paris
