= Tenniseum =

Tennis museum in Paris, France

Coordinates: 48°50′50″N 2°15′1″E

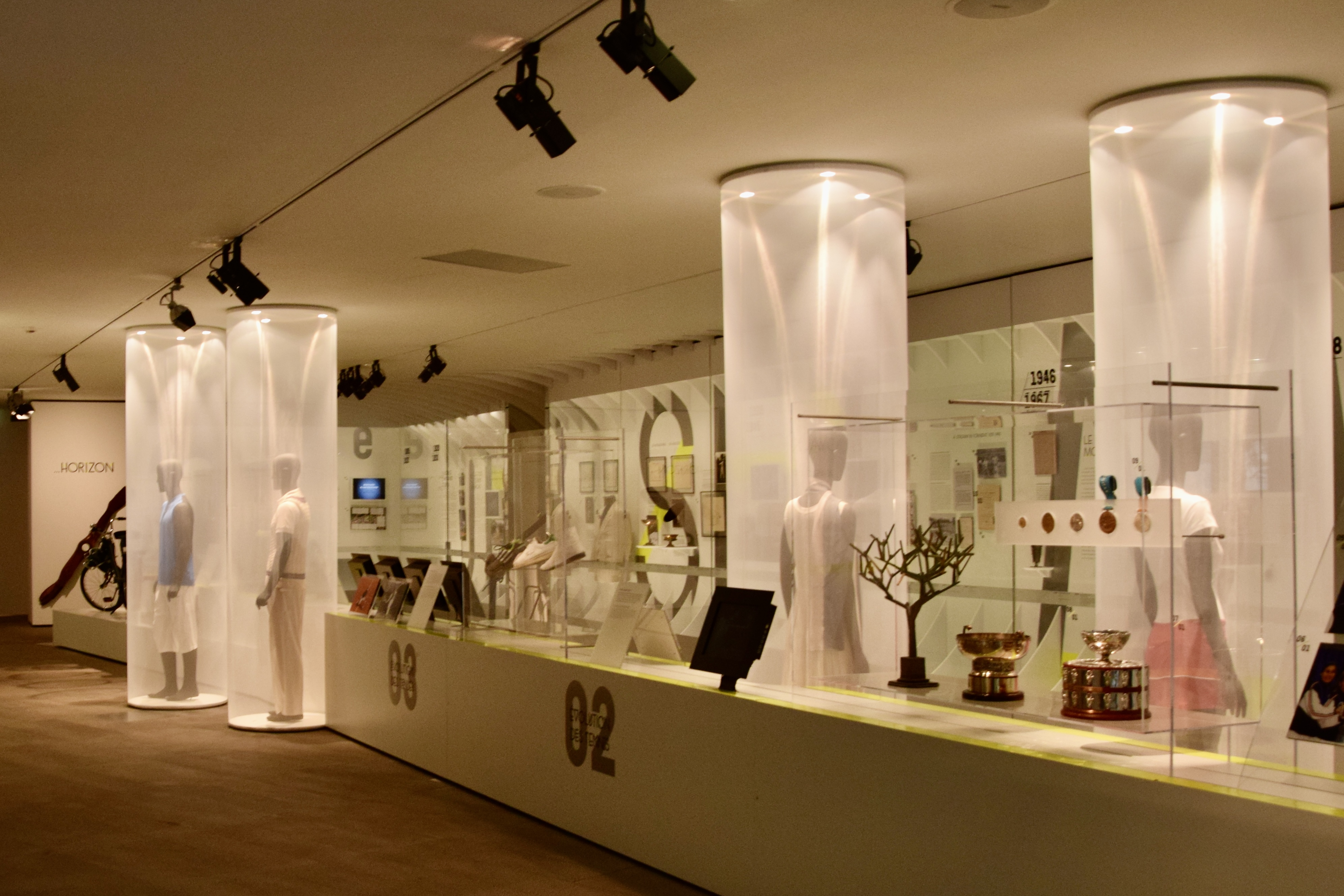
Interior of the museum

The Tenniseum, also known as the Musée du Tennis or the Musée de Roland-Garros, is a tennis museum located in the Stade Roland Garros in the 16th arrondissement at 2, avenue Gordon-Bennett, Paris, France.

== History ==
The museum was created in 2003 by the Fédération Française de Tennis (French Federation of Tennis), and architect Bruno Moinard, and was originally named the Musée Federation Française de Tennis. The museum was inaugurated in 2003 by chairman of the federation, Christian Bîmes. Later, the museum was renamed the Tenniseum after refurbishments of the Roland Garros Stadium during 2016, that caused the museum to close for a period of 8 years. It reopened with an inauguration on 23 May 2024, alongside the draw for the 2024 French Open, with Richard Gasquet present at the event.

== Collection ==
The museum is located in the building which was previously the gardener's cottage at Roland Garros. The new venue created there contains about 1000 m^{2} of exhibition space, a 358-seat auditorium, an immersive multimedia cinema, and a gift shop. Its permanent collection is primarily multimedia (video displays), with 4000 hours of audio-visual collections, and photographs; it also contains roughly a hundred tennis racquets dating from 1920 to the present. The museum's library contains over 3000 documents dating back as far as 1550.

The museum also offers tours of exclusive areas of the stadium, such as the locker rooms, and centre court.

== See also ==
- List of museums in Paris
- International Tennis Hall of Fame
