= Musée-Galerie de la Seita =

Defunct museum in Paris, France

Coordinates: 48°51′41″N 2°18′33″E

The Musée-Galerie de la Seita was a museum of tobacco-related objects located in the 7th arrondissement of Paris at 12, rue Surcouf, Paris, France. It opened in 1979 and closed in June 2000.

The museum opened in 1979 on the site where Gros Caillou tobaccos were once manufactured. It displays collections acquired from 1937 onwards by the Societe Nationale d'Exploitation Industrielle des Tabacs et Allumettes (SEITA), the former state-owned manufacturer of French tobacco products including Gitanes and Gauloises.

The museum displays about 400 tobacco-related objects from Europe and elsewhere, selected from a total collection of about 3000 pieces. Its exhibits explain the plant and its botanical features, early factories, ritual and social uses, and methods of consuming tobacco. The museum contains a fine collection of wooden, ceramic, and meerschaum pipes, including hookahs and Native American ceremonial pipes, as well as items from the Musée de l'Homme reflecting the origins of tobacco in pre-Columbian America.

Its gallery has displayed temporary art exhibitions by artists including Jean-Michel Basquiat, Otto Dix, Alexej von Jawlensky, Alfred Kubin, and Marianne von Werefkin.

== See also ==
- Musée du Fumeur
- List of museums in Paris
