= Musée d'Art Dentaire Pierre Fauchard =

Museum in Paris, France

Coordinates: 48°52′6.8″N 2°16′44″E

The Musée d'Art Dentaire Pierre Fauchard (French pronunciation: [myze daʁ dɑ̃tɛʁ pjɛʁ foʃaʁ]) is a museum of dental history located in the 16th arrondissement at the Académie Nationale de Chirurgie Dentaire, 22 Rue Émile Ménier, Paris, France. It is open Wednesday afternoons by appointment. The nearest métro and RER stations are Porte Dauphine, Avenue Foch, and Victor Hugo.

The museum dates to 1879, when Parisian dentists began to organize a dental school; with it the Musée d'Art Dentaire was established to display old techniques and tools. By 1892, its collection contained around 300 items. In 1937, the museum was renamed the Musée Pierre Fauchard to honor Pierre Fauchard (1678–1761), sometimes called the father of modern dentistry. Since 2003, its collections have been maintained by the Musée de l'Assistance Publique – Hôpitaux de Paris.

Today the museum contains over 1,000 items relating to the history of dentistry, including instruments and dental chairs from the seventeenth century to nineteenth century, about 350 items for the cleaning and extraction of teeth, about 200 dental prosthetics, as well as etchings, paintings from the seventeenth century Dutch School, and a library of about 500 antique books including an original edition of Fauchard's "Le Chirurgien Dentiste", published 1728. One item of particular note is the magnificent Charles X case, manufactured in the United States in the middle of the 19th century, which contains a total of 130 instruments for the maintenance and extraction of teeth.

== See also ==
- List of museums in Paris
