= Musée de l'Éventail =

- Musée de l’Éventail
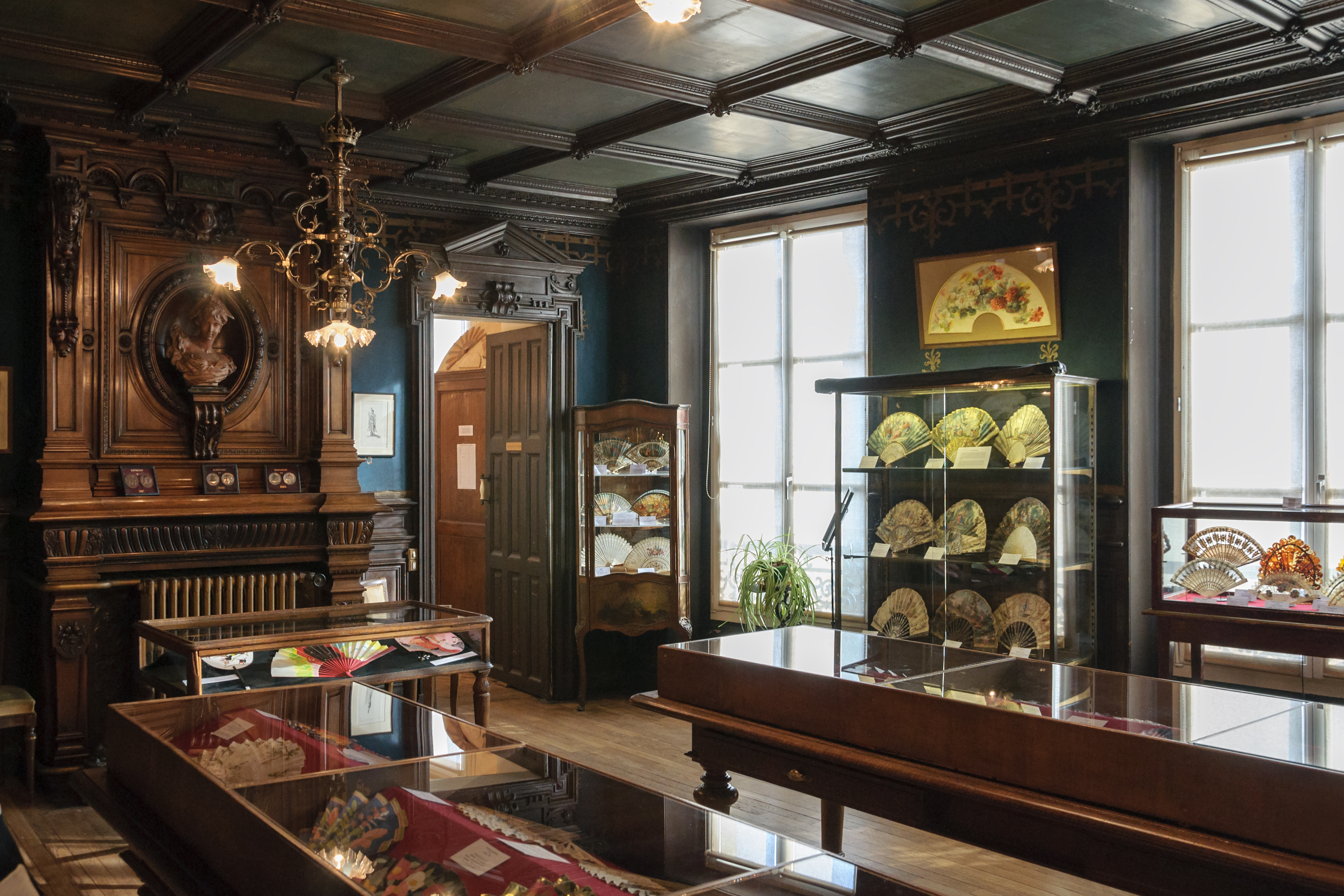
- Established: 1993
- Location: 2, Boulevard de Strasbourg, 75010 Paris
- Coordinates: 48.869444°N 2.354722°E
- Collections: Fans
- Collection size: 1000

The Musée de l'Éventail (French pronunciation: [myze də levɑ̃taj], Fan Museum), or more formally L'Atelier Hoguet Musée de l'Éventail ([latəlje ɔɡɛ myze də levɑ̃taj]), was a private museum of fans and fan-making located in the 10th arrondissement at 2, boulevard de Strasbourg, Paris, France. It used to be open several afternoons per week (Monday, Tuesday and Wednesday) and was closed annually during the month of August; an admission fee was charged. The nearest métro station is Strasbourg – Saint-Denis.

The museum was located within the Atelier Anne Hoguet, a workshop for fan-making and restoration. Its exhibits were displayed in a showroom established in 1893 by fan-makers Lepault & Deberghe, purchased in 1960 by Hervé Hoguet. The museum was established in 1993.

The museum is housed within two rooms. The former showroom is furnished in Henry II style with a monumental fireplace, three chandeliers, blue walls embroidered with fleur-de-lys in gold thread, and walnut furnishings. It contains an exhibition of fans from the eighteenth century to the present day, along with the tools, workbenches, and materials used in making fans, including mother-of-pearl, ivory, horn, bone, and wood.

== See also ==
- List of museums in Paris
