= Musée du Service des Objets Trouvés =

Museum in Paris, France

Coordinates: 48°50′0″N 2°17′56″E

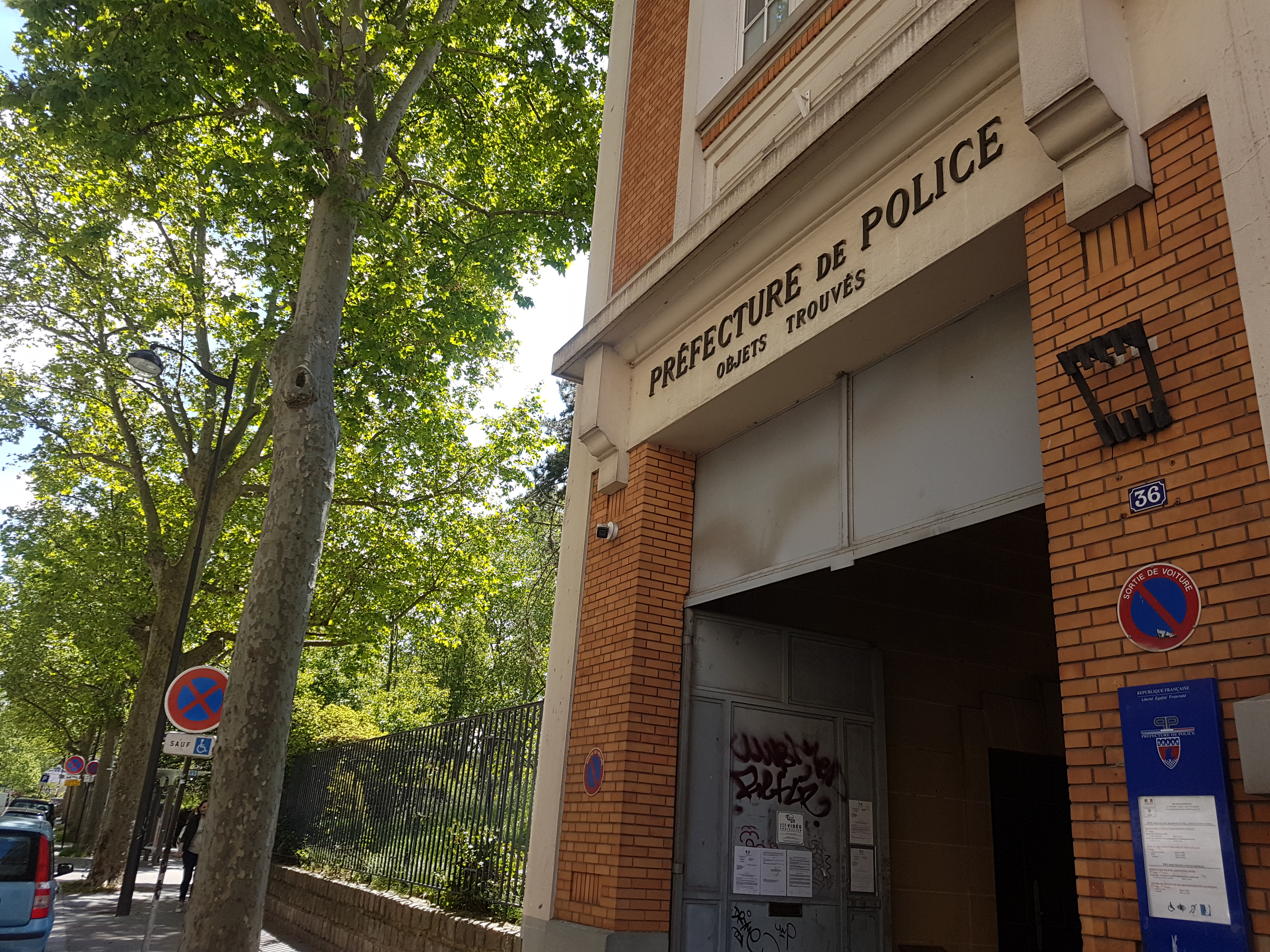
Entrée du Musée du Service des Objets Trouvés

The Musée du Service des Objets Trouvés (French pronunciation: [myze dy sɛʁvis dez‿ɔbʒɛ tʁuve]) or "Museum of Found Objects", also known as the Petit musée des objets trouvés ([pəti myze dez‿ɔbʒɛ tʁuve]), is a small collection of lost items maintained by the Service des Objets Trouvés ("Lost and Found Department") of the Paris Police. It is located in the 15th arrondissement at 36, rue des Morillons, Paris, France. Although it is located within the public lost and found repository, the museum itself is not generally open to the public.

A thousand objects are lost every day in the suburbs and airports of Paris, found by others and brought to the police department or placed in a mailbox to be delivered to the museum. The top three objects found: identity documents, keys and glasses. In 2011, 186,000 objects were found and delivered to the museum for recovery.

The museum contains a number of unusual items that have not (yet) been claimed by their owners, including a lobster found at Paris-Orly Airport, a funerary urn lost in the subway station near Père Lachaise Cemetery, a fireman's helmet, skulls, a wooden leg, wedding dresses, and a roll of copper weighing over 100 kilograms (220 lb).

The museum is mentioned, along with a number of other small museums in Paris, in chapter 81 of The Museum of Innocence by Nobel prize winner Orhan Pamuk.

== See also ==
- List of museums in Paris
