= Fondation Jean Dubuffet =

French art fondation in Paris

Coordinates: 48°41′39″N 2°32′51″E

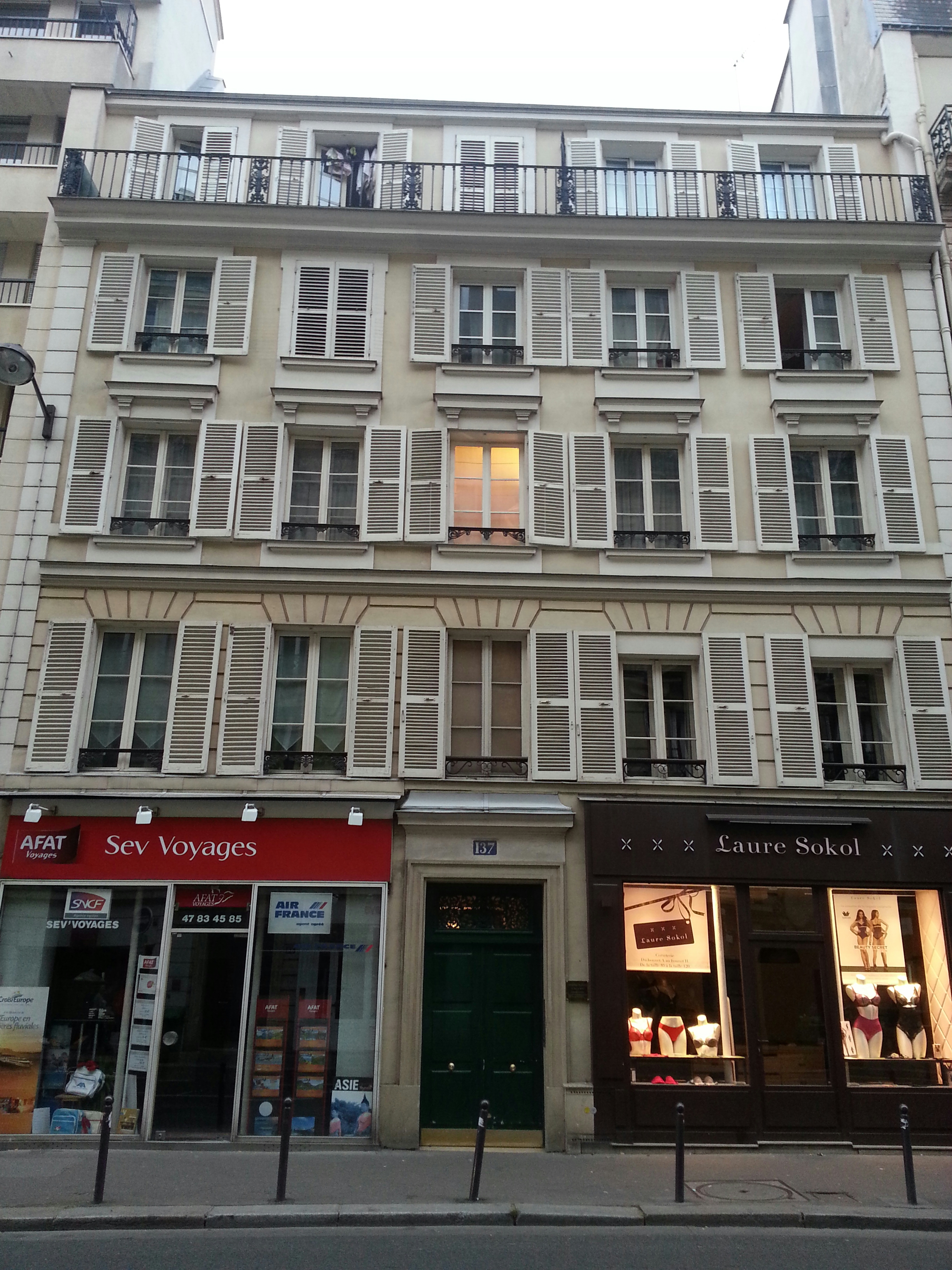
Fondation Jean Dubuffet, 137 Rue de Sèvres

The Fondation Jean Dubuffet is a foundation and museum established by artist Jean Dubuffet (1901–1985) in 1973. Its registered office is on the Rue de Moulin Neuf, Sente des Vaux-Ruelle aux Chevaux, Périgny-sur-Yerres, Val-de-Marne, with the secretariat located in the 6th arrondissement of Paris at 137 Rue de Sèvres, Paris, France. Both are open to the public; an admission fee is charged.

The foundation acquires and conserves Dubuffet's original work, as well as items from his personal collection, including plans, designs and models, gouaches, drawings and prints, notes and manuscripts, documents, etc. It contains over 1000 works and over 14,000 photographs of his art. Its main collection is housed in Périgny-sur-Yerres, and open to the public. In addition, the foundation's Paris townhouse, acquired by the artist in 1962, contains an exhibition as well as a center of study.

== See also ==
- List of museums in Paris
- List of single-artist museums
