= Musée de Radio France =

Museum in France

- Musée de Radio France
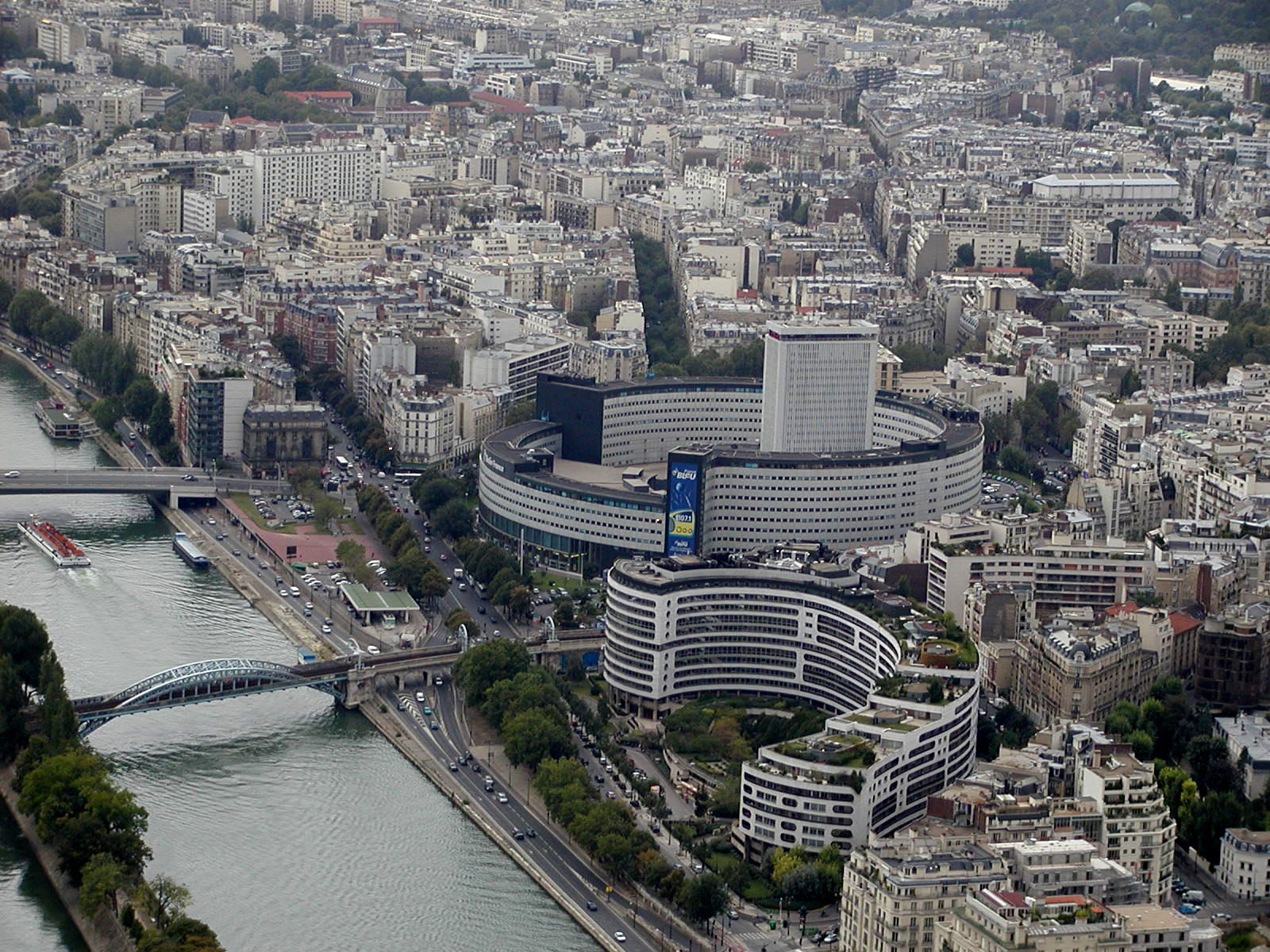
- Location: France
- Coordinates: 48°51′09″N 2°16′42″E
- Website: www.radiofrance.fr/rf/musee/accueil
- Location of Musée de Radio France

The Musée de Radio France was a museum operated by Radio France and located in the Maison de Radio-France, near the Pont de Grenelle in the XVIe arrondissement at 116, avenue du Président Kennedy, Paris, France. The museum was established in 1966, and contained a remarkable collection of radios and televisions from their origins to the present day, including the 1793 telegraph by Claude Chappe and early crystal radios. The museum's 2000 objects include prototypes and commercial devices, archival documents, photographs, and manuscripts, replicas of early radio laboratories and studios, and exhibits featuring research by Edouard Branly, Lee de Forest, Heinrich Hertz, Guglielmo Marconi, James Clerk Maxwell, and Alexander Stepanovich Popov. In 2007, the museum was closed to the public due to the renovation of the Maison de Radio France.

== See also ==
- List of museums in Paris
