= Petit Musée de l'Argenterie =

Museum in Paris, France

Coordinates: 48°50′42″N 2°22′50″E

The Petit Musée de l'Argenterie is a privately operated museum of decorative arts made of silver located within the Ateliers du Cuivre et de l'Argent, Viaduc des Arts, 109-113, Avenue Daumesnil, Paris, France. The museum is located in the Bercy district in the 12th arrondissement. The nearest Paris Métro stop is Reuilly-Diderot on Line 1 and Line 8. It is open daily except Sundays and holidays.

The museum contains a small collection of silver objects for tableware, wine, tea, tobacco, and fashion, such as a combined fork-knife for one-armed people, chop holders, marrow pullers, moustache spoons, pomanders, etc.

== See also ==
- List of museums in Paris
