= Musée de Notre Dame de Paris =

Defunct museum in Paris, France

Musée de Notre-Dame de Paris
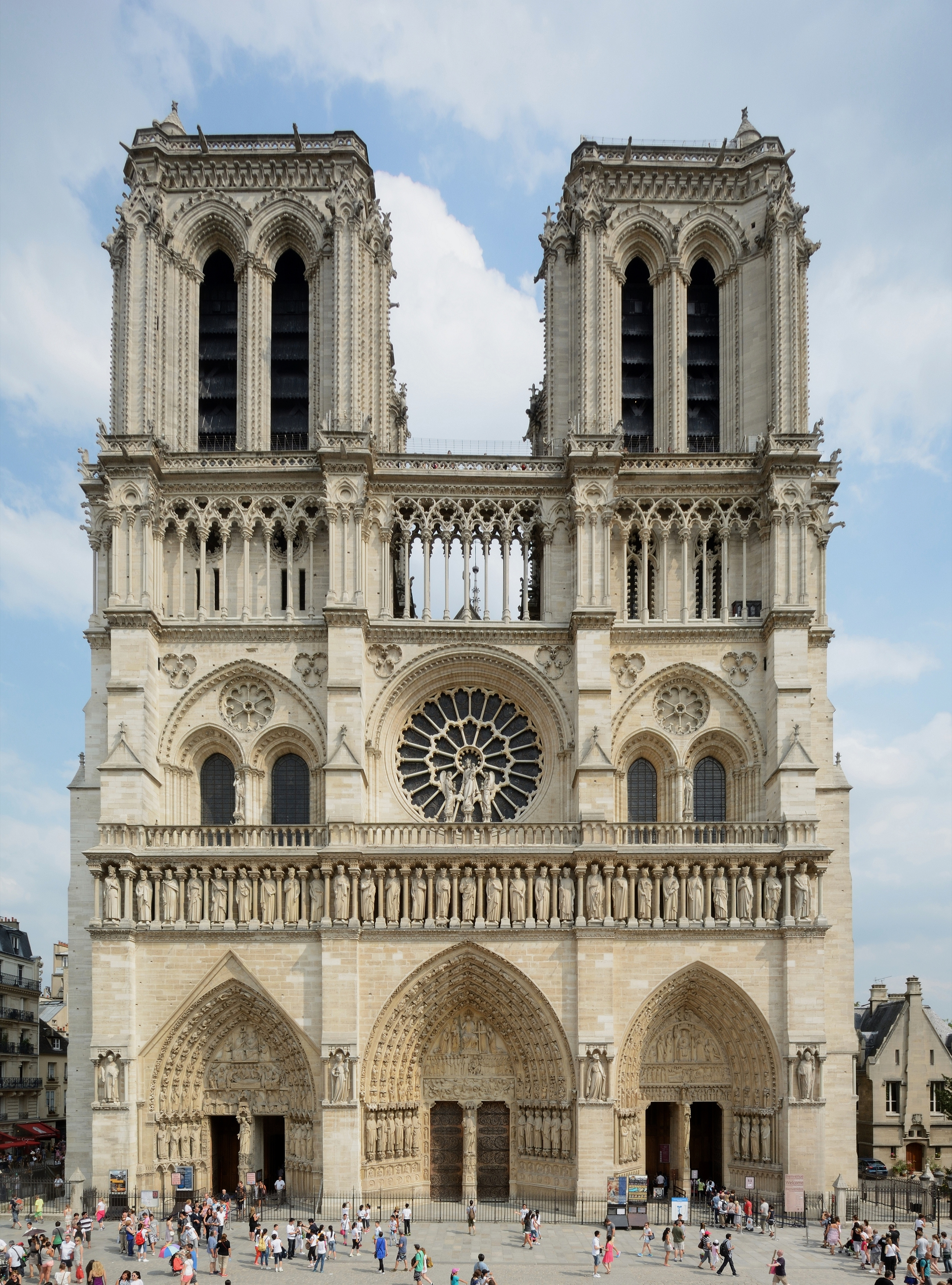
- Established: 1951
- Location: 4th arrondissement of Paris, France

The Musée de Notre-Dame de Paris was a small museum dedicated to the cathedral of Notre-Dame de Paris and its archaeology.

It was located at 10 Rue du Cloître Notre-Dame, Paris, France. The museum was established in 1951 to present the cathedral's history, as well as archaeological objects found in the cathedral's crypt dating from Roman times to the 19th century. It displayed objects discovered in archaeological digs; drawings, plans and engravings of the cathedral; scale models; paintings; and historical documents including a petition to restore the cathedral signed by, among others, Victor Hugo and Jean Auguste Dominique Ingres.

The museum was open to the public several afternoons per week; an admission fee was charged. It closed in November 2008.

== See also ==
- List of museums in Paris
