= Musée Moissan =

Museum in Paris, France

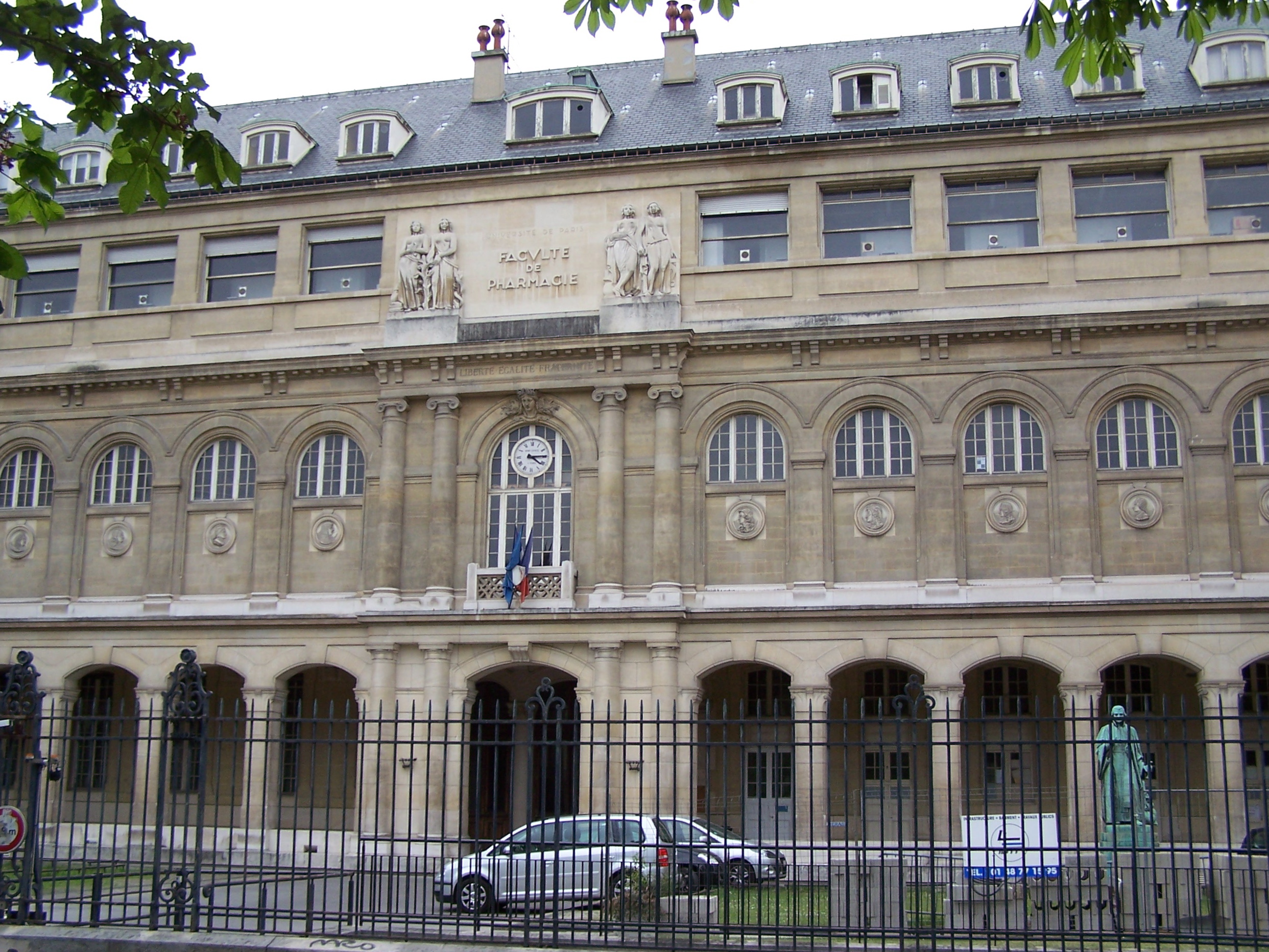
- Location: Paris, France

The Musée Moissan (French pronunciation: [myze mwasɑ̃]) is a museum dedicated to Henri Moissan (1852–1907), winner of the 1906 Nobel Prize in Chemistry. It is maintained by the Université René Descartes-Paris 5 faculty of pharmaceutical and biological sciences, and located in the 6th arrondissement of Paris at 4, avenue de l'Observatoire, Paris, France. It is open by appointment only; admission is free.

== See also ==
- List of museums in Paris
