= Musée Lenine =

Defunct museum in Paris, France

Coordinates: 48°49′34.8″N 2°19′50″E

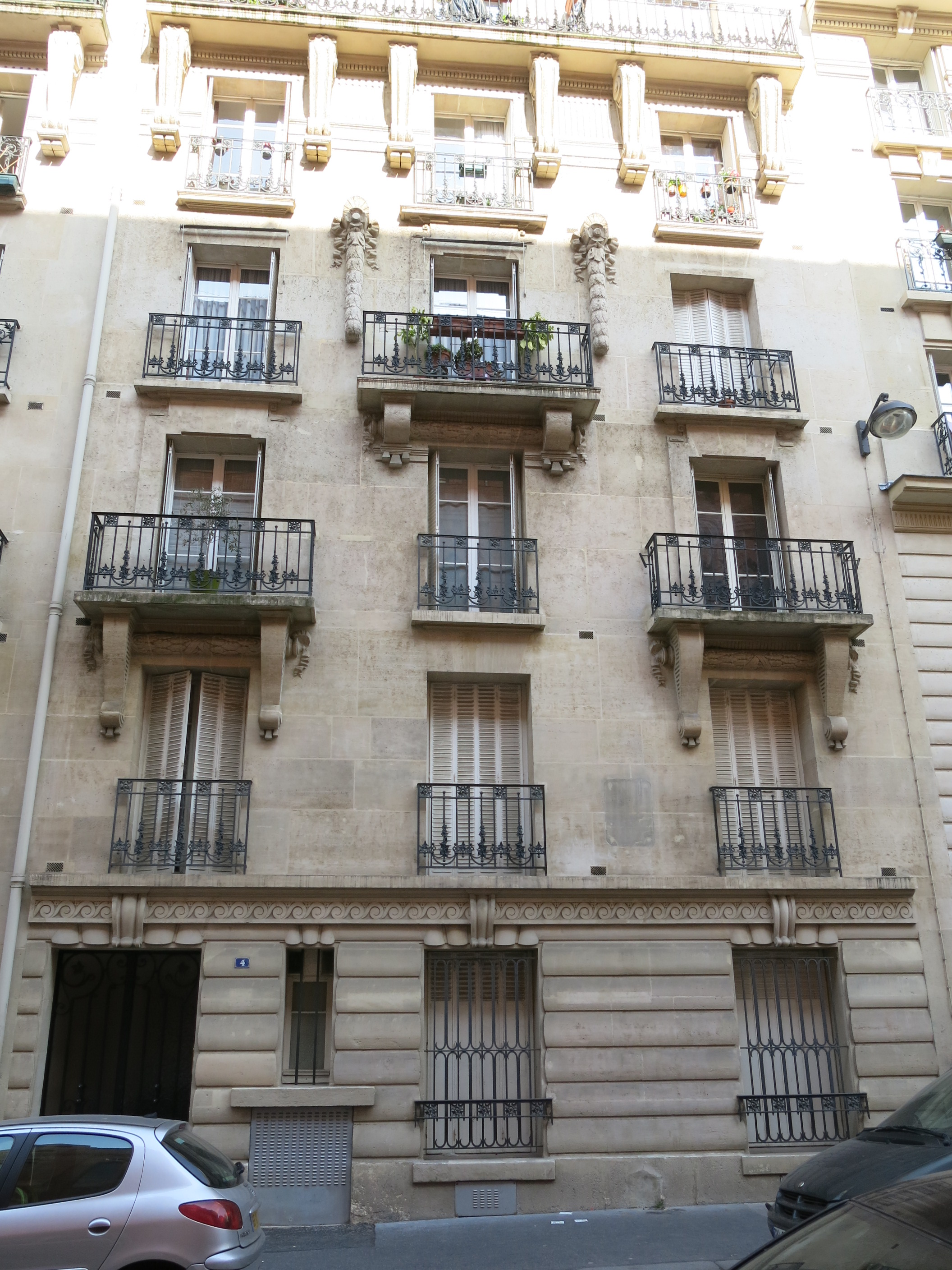
Facade of the building in 2015

The Musée Lenine was a museum devoted to Vladimir Lenin, located at 4, rue Marie-Rose, in the 14th arrondissement of Paris district, France. The museum closed in 2007.

The museum contained the reconstructed apartment where Russian communist Vladimir Lenin, his wife Nadezhda Konstantinovna Krupskaya, and her mother lived from July 1909 to June 1912. It measured 59 square metres (640 sq ft).

== Bibliography ==
- Anthony Glyn, Susan Glyn, The Companion Guide to Paris, Companion Guides, Paris, 2000, pages 271-272. ISBN 1-900639-20-3.

== See also ==
- List of museums in Paris
- Tampere Lenin Museum
- Paris.org entry
- Bellaciao articles (French)
