= Centre de la Mer et des Eaux =

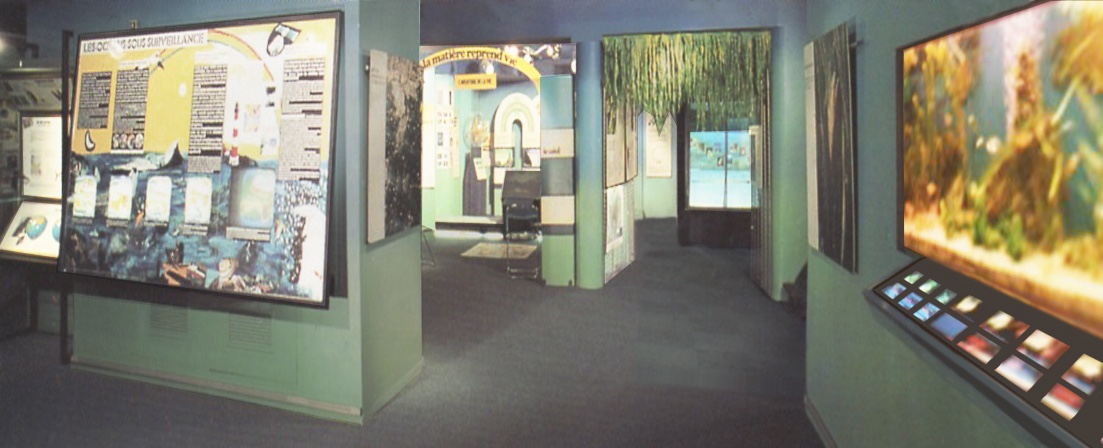
- Interactive map of Centre de la Mer et des Eaux
- 48°50′40″N 2°20′33″E
- Date opened: 1911
- Date closed: 2010
- Location: Paris, France
- Volume of largest tank: 4,000 litres (1,100 US gal)
- Total volume of tanks: 15,000 litres (4,000 US gal)
- Website: web.archive.org/web/20080705095038/http://www.oceano.org/cme2

The Centre de la Mer et des Eaux was an aquarium and museum of marine life located in the 5th arrondissement in the building of the Institut Océanographique at 195, rue Saint-Jacques, Paris, France. It closed in November 2010. Dedicated to the dissemination of scientific culture concerning the marine world and to the development of knowledge of the ocean, it included a library, seven aquariums, and presented permanent and temporary exhibitions, as well as scientific mediations, animations and workshops.

The Institut Océanographique was established in 1906 by Albert I, Prince of Monaco, and inaugurated in 1911. In addition to research laboratories and amphitheaters, the institute contained the Centre de la Mer et des Eaux dedicated to educating the public about marine life and related environmental issues. Its displays presented aspects of oceanography and marine technology, as well as scale models, reconstructions of marine landscapes, and aquariums.

The center included a set of 6 aquariums, each containing from 500 to 4,000 litres (130 to 1,060 US gal) of seawater for a total volume of 15,000 litres (4,000 US gal), as follows:

- Pool 1 – fish of the coral reef
- Pool 2 – reef coral and fauna that live within it
- Pool 3 – Brightly colored fish
- Pool 4 – Small fish
- Pool 5 – Clown fish and sea anemone
- Pool 6 – The French Atlantic coast (shellfish, sea urchins, sea anemones, and starfish, in water chilled to 12 °C)

An additional terrarium contained turtles that had been given to the museum when they had become too large and aggressive for home cultivation. Special displays explained the richness of life in coastal and around hydrothermal vents, and illustrated the relationships between humans and four types of shellfish (scallop, oyster, cowry, and the nautilus).

== See also ==
- List of museums in Paris
