= Musée de l'Holographie =

Defunct museum in Paris, France

Coordinates: 48.8619°N 2.3469°E

The Musée de l'Holographie was a notable museum of holography located in Paris, France. The museum was established in 1980, and located for some years in the Forum des Halles. According to S. Johnston, it closed its doors in 1994. But in fact, it was in April 1996. The museum's collections are now shown in touring exhibits in France and around the world.

The Holography Museum is currently closed to the public, but its collections are still on show in France and abroad.

The Esculturas de Luz (Sculptures of Light) exhibition at the Feria de Asturias from August 7 to 22, 2010 in Gijón attracted over 80,000 visitors.

In 1983, over 4,000 visitors a day flocked to the Beijing Exhibition Center for the first hologram exhibition in China. Since then, the Museum's collections have toured the world, with almost 400 exhibitions on 5 continents.

== See also ==
- List of museums in Paris
