= Mundolingua =

Coordinates: 48°51′01″N 2°20′05″E

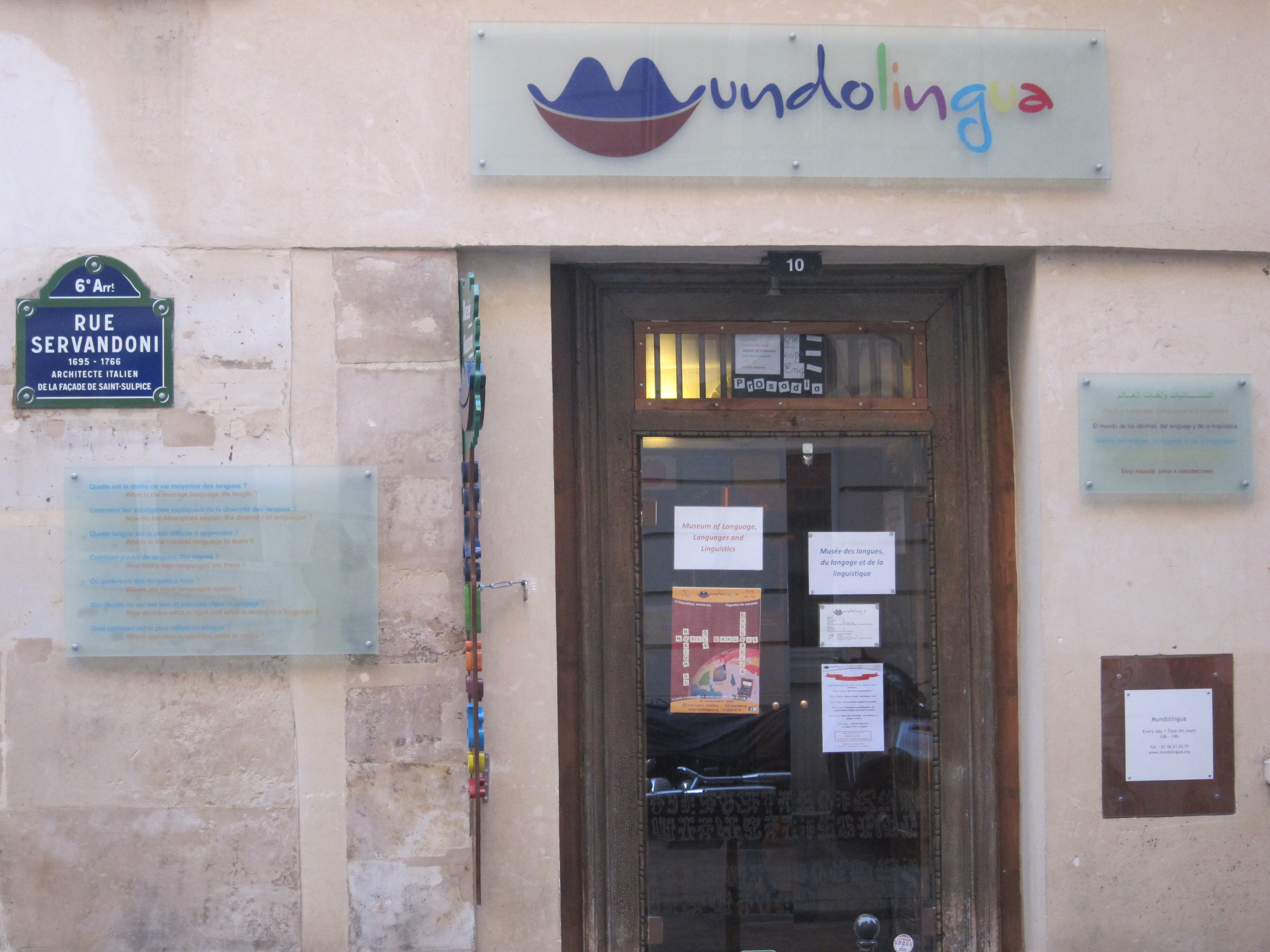
- Entrance to the museum
- Established: 11 October 2013
- Location: 10, rue Servandoni 6th arrondissement of Paris, France
- Type: Science museum
- Director: Mark Oremland
- Website: www.mundolingua.org/en/

Mundolingua is a museum situated in the 6th arrondissement of Paris. Its purpose is to present information, objects and documents relating to language, linguistic diversity and linguistics to the general public.

== History ==
The concept of the museum was launched in 2010 by Mark Oremland, a New Zealander who studied linguistics at Paris Descartes University and who wanted to make this field accessible to the widest possible public. Between 2010, and 2013, the documentary resources were collected, and the pedagogical material was designed. In 2013, a team of craftspeople, computer specialists, students, professors and translators worked on building, organizing and presenting this material in the different spaces of the museum.

The museum was inaugurated on 11 October 2013, by Jean-Pierre Lecoq, mayor of the 6th arrondissement.

== Collections ==
Split into two levels (ground floor and basement), the museum presents its information via touchscreens accompanied by recordings (headphones), along with games and objects that illustrate the various subjects.

=== Ground floor ===
==== Language ====
The first section deals with language in general – things that apply to all languages: the particularities of human language in contrast with animal communication, double articulation and the vocal apparatus.

Amongst the various objects on the ground floor there is a large head that shows the vocal apparatus, on which the visitor can, by pressing chosen phonetic characters, listen to the corresponding sound and see the physical place of articulation lit up.

==== Learning ====
The second room is dedicated to the acquisition of one's own language(s) (mother tongue), learning foreign languages and language difficulties (stuttering, etc.). There is a small library, and in the booth of a reconstructed language lab one can listen to recordings of 1700 different languages.

=== Basement ===
The basement is a vaulted cellar of approximately 100 square metres (1,100 sq ft), divided into three sections.

==== Languages: Past and Present ====
This section is dedicated to the diversity of languages, their evolution and their alphabets.

On the ceiling, there are 3D tree models showing the generally accepted genealogies of the major language families (Indo-European, Amerindian, Altaic, Chamito-Semitic, Austronesian, Sino-Tibetan, etc.). There is also a globe showing the geographic distribution of these language families.

Visuals and audios explain the different ways in which languages evolve and influence one another, along with the idea of language policies.

There is also a life-sized facsimile of the Rosetta Stone, made by the British Museum.

A large scale model of the braille alphabet enables one to read a phrase in braille.

==== Playing with language ====
The section that follows is a fun area devoted to codes, slangs, humour, invented languages, proverbs and other games with language.

In addition to the visual and audio information, there are board games in different languages (including a giant Scrabble board), as well as an Enigma machine (coding machine used in the Second World War).

==== New Technologies and Linguistics ====
The 5th and last section is dedicated to the history of the science of linguistics from the ancient Greeks to Chomsky, along with an alcove on new technologies connected with language, such as machine translation and speech recognition.

One can find a variety of machines used in the transmission or recording of language: a telex, a microfiche reader and a typewriter with both normal and phonetic alphabet keyboards.

== Activities ==
The museum has two levels of visit plans for school groups, including questionnaires to fill out and a workshop; a visit plan for children; and another for blind visitors. There are also thematic evenings, including lectures and debates.
