= Forgues (surname) =

Forgues is a surname. Notable people with the surname include:

- Christopher Forgues (born 1979), American artist and musician
- Fernand Forgues (1884–1973), French rower and rugby union player
- Matthew Forgues (born 1992), American racewalker
- Pierre Forgues (born 1938), French politician
- Pierre Marie Laurent Forgues (1761–?), French soldier
- Sandra Forgues (born 1969), French slalom canoeist

== See also ==
- Suzette Forgues Halasz (1918–2004), Canadian musician
