= Republican Guard (France) =

Security force

- Garde républicaine
- Emblem of the Republican Guard
- Active: 1848–present
- Country: France
- Branch: National Gendarmerie
- Type: Infantry; Cavalry
- Role: Honour guard Security
- Size: 3,300 (Brigade of three regiments)
- Garrison/HQ: Paris
- March: Quick: "Defile de la Garde Républicaine"; Slow: "Marche de la Garde consulaire à Marengo"
- Decorations: Légion d'honneur Croix de Guerre TOE
- Website: Official website (in French)

The Republican Guard (French: Garde républicaine, [ɡaʁd ʁepyblikɛn]) is part of the French National Gendarmerie. It is responsible for special security duties in the Paris area and for providing guards of honour at official ceremonies in France.

Its missions include guarding important public buildings in Paris, such as the Élysée Palace (the residence of the President of the French Republic), the Hôtel Matignon (the residence of the Prime Minister of France), the Luxembourg Palace (the Senate), the Palais Bourbon (the National Assembly) and the Palais de Justice, as well as keeping public order in Paris. Its duties also include ceremonial and security services for the highest national personalities and important foreign guests; military ceremonies and guards of honour for fallen soldiers; support of other law enforcement forces with intervention teams; and staffing horseback patrol stations (particularly for the forests of the Île-de-France region).

The close physical protection of the President of the Republic is entrusted to the Security Group for the Presidency of the Republic (GSP), a mixed police–gendarmerie unit that is not part of the Republican Guard. However, the Republican Guard does provide counter-sniper teams (Tireurs d'élite Gendarmerie or TEG) and intervention platoons (pelotons d'intervention). The Republican Guard also represents France at international events at home and abroad.

== History ==
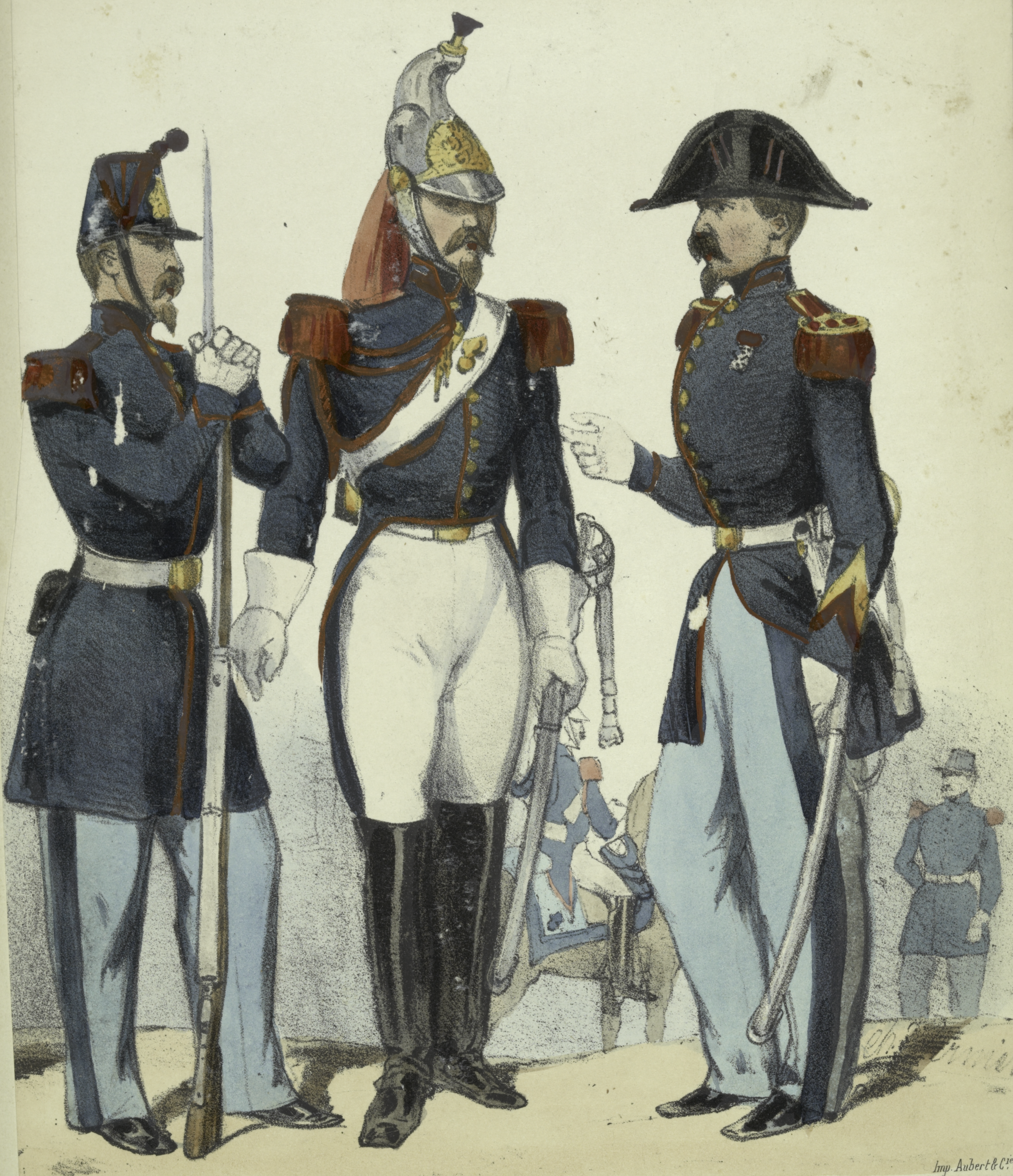
Early uniforms of the Republican Guard (1848)

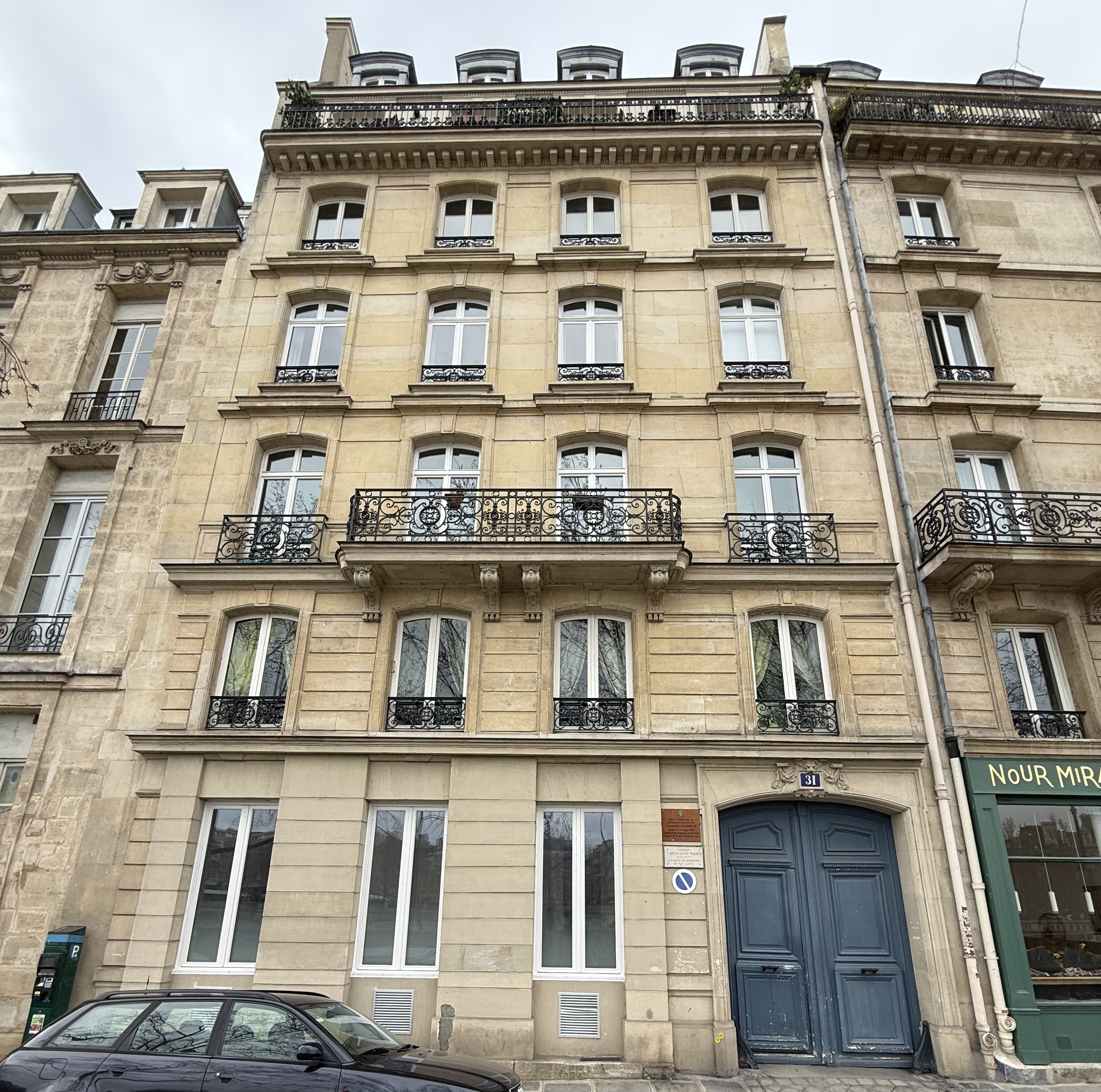
Building at 31, quai de Bourbon in Paris, headquarters of the Republican Guard from 1871 to relocation to the Caserne des Célestins around 1900

The Republican Guard is the heir of the various bodies that preceded it in the course of French and Parisian history and whose task was to honor and protect the high authorities of the State and the capital city – Gardes Françaises of the French kings, Consular and Imperial Guard of Napoleon, etc. Its name derives from the Municipal Guard of Paris, established on 12 Vendémiaire XI (October 4, 1802) by Napoleon Bonaparte. This unit distinguished itself in battles of historical significance, including Danzig and Friedland in 1807, Alcolea in 1808 and Burgos in 1812.

In 1813, the Municipal Guard was dissolved following the attempted coup of General Malet and replaced by the Imperial Gendarmerie of Paris and then, under the Restoration, the Royal Guard of Paris and the Royal Mounted Police of Paris. In 1830, it was recreated, but after the Revolution of 1848, it was removed in favor of the Civic Guard (which proved to be a transient institution).

In June 1848, under the Second Republic, the Republican Guard of Paris was created, including an infantry regiment and a regiment of cavalry. On February 1, 1849, president Louis-Napoléon Bonaparte made the Guard a part of the National Gendarmerie. It received its insignia on July 14, 1880.

The Republican Guard did not take part in World War I as a unit, but more than one third of its personnel were seconded to Army regiments for the duration of the conflict. As a consequence, its flag and banner are decorated with the Knight's Cross of the Legion of Honour. During World War II, it reported to the police headquarters and took the name of Guard of Paris. Part of its staff rallied to General de Gaulle, and the Guard was involved in fighting alongside the FFI during the liberation of Paris.

From 1947 to 1954, the Republican Guard took part in the Indochina War by sending three "Legions of March", which were mainly assigned to the training of allied indigenous troops and to the defense of certain places. The three legions, comprising a constant workforce of nearly 3,000 men, suffered heavy losses (more than 600 dead and 1,500 wounded during the conflict), which earned it the Croix de Guerre TOE. In 1954, the Republican Guard was renamed as the Mobile Gendarmerie and the Republican Guard of Paris became the Republican Guard. Both organizations were then and still remain part of the same branch in the French Gendarmerie.

In 1978, President Valéry Giscard d'Estaing gave the Guard new insignias on 11 November 1979 when the infantry regiment was split into the current two separate regiments. Michèle Alliot-Marie, Minister of Defence, said in October 2002: "The Republican Guard has a popularity that transcends borders", and it contributes "to the splendour of the French military and France."

== Missions ==
=== Ceremonial duties ===
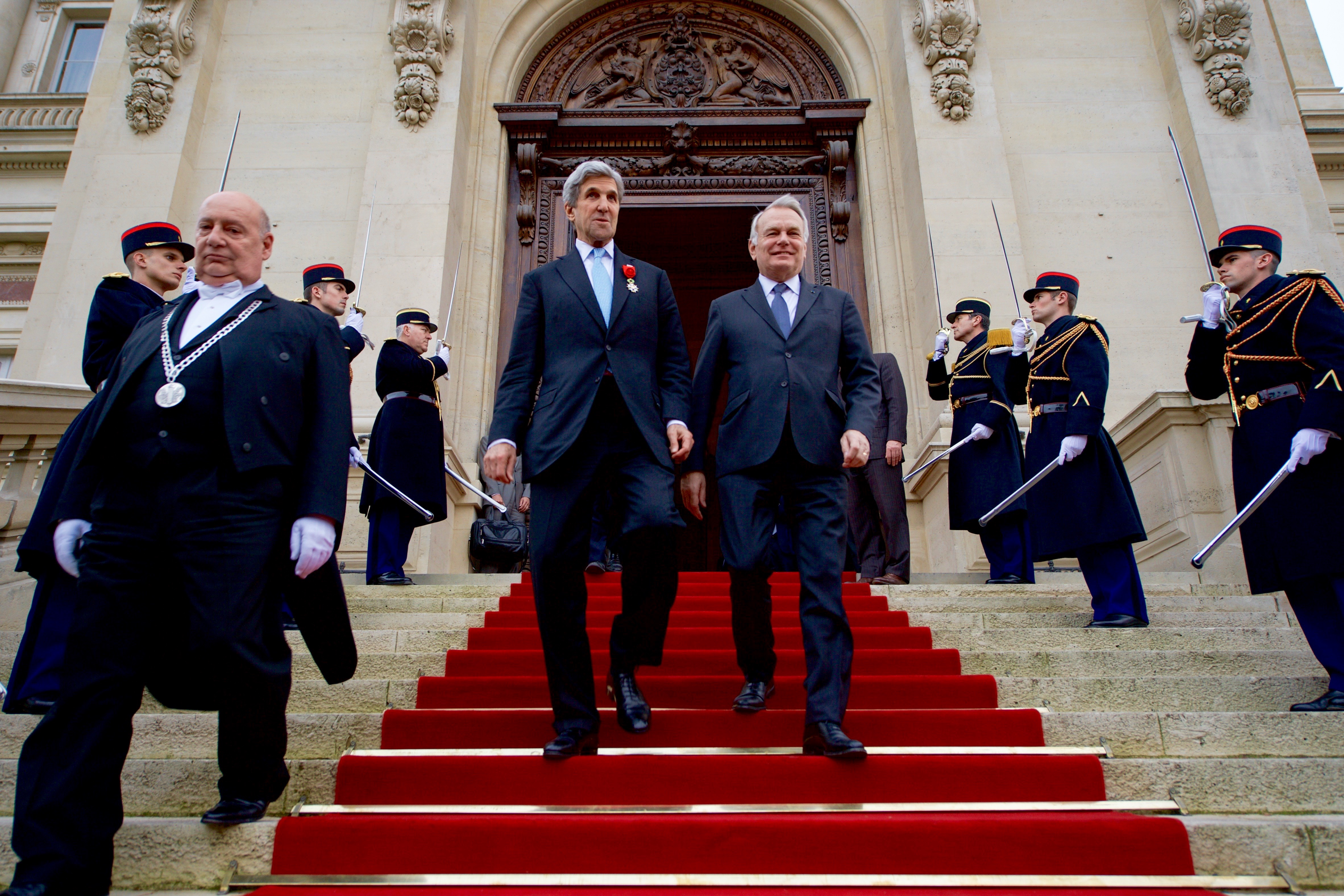
John Kerry and Jean-Marc Ayrault leaving the Ministry of Foreign Affairs, surrounded by the Republican Guard

These ceremonial functions are performed mainly by the first infantry regiment, the cavalry regiment and occasionally by the second infantry regiment.

Detachments from the cavalry regiment reinforce the two infantry regiments in carrying out ceremonial and security duties in and around state buildings. These include the lining of both sides of the entry stairs of the Elysée or Matignon Palaces (and other buildings) by dismounted cavalry on special occasions. These Republican Guards belong to the Cavalry Regiment and not to the infantry units whose mission is to ensure the security of these palaces and of senior government figures. Certain ceremonial duties in the form of honour guards are performed during state visits to the Paris museums or the Opera, as well as during other ceremonies (for example at the French Academy).

=== Security missions ===
Although the ceremonial duties attract more public attention, more than 80% of the missions assigned to the Garde are security missions. These include missions performed for the state such as protection of state buildings but also missions performed for the benefit of the population (for example patrols in the parks and streets).

Security missions

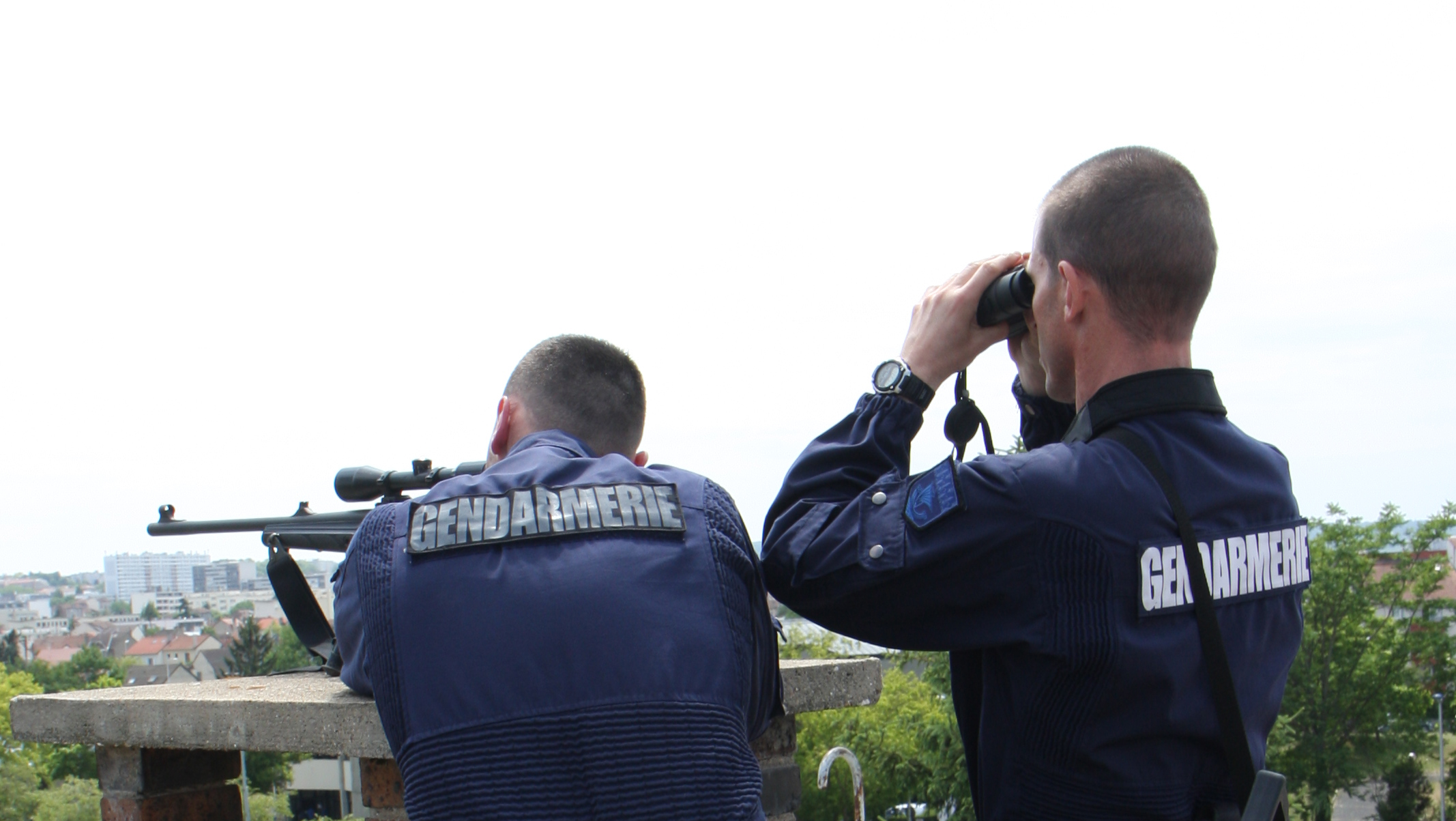
Guard counter-snipers (tireurs d'élite Gendarmerie or TEG)

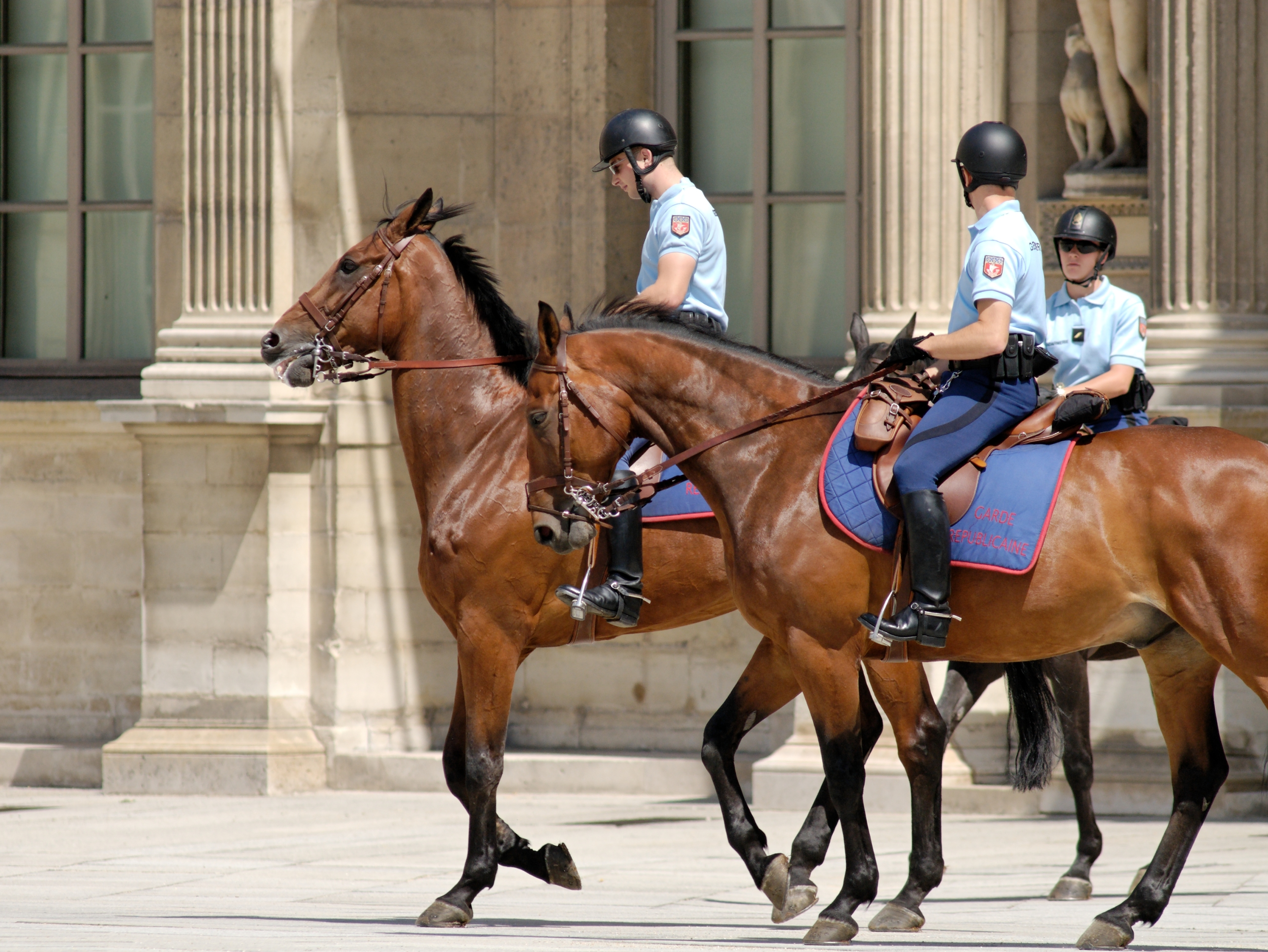
Mounted guards in service dress patrolling near the Louvre

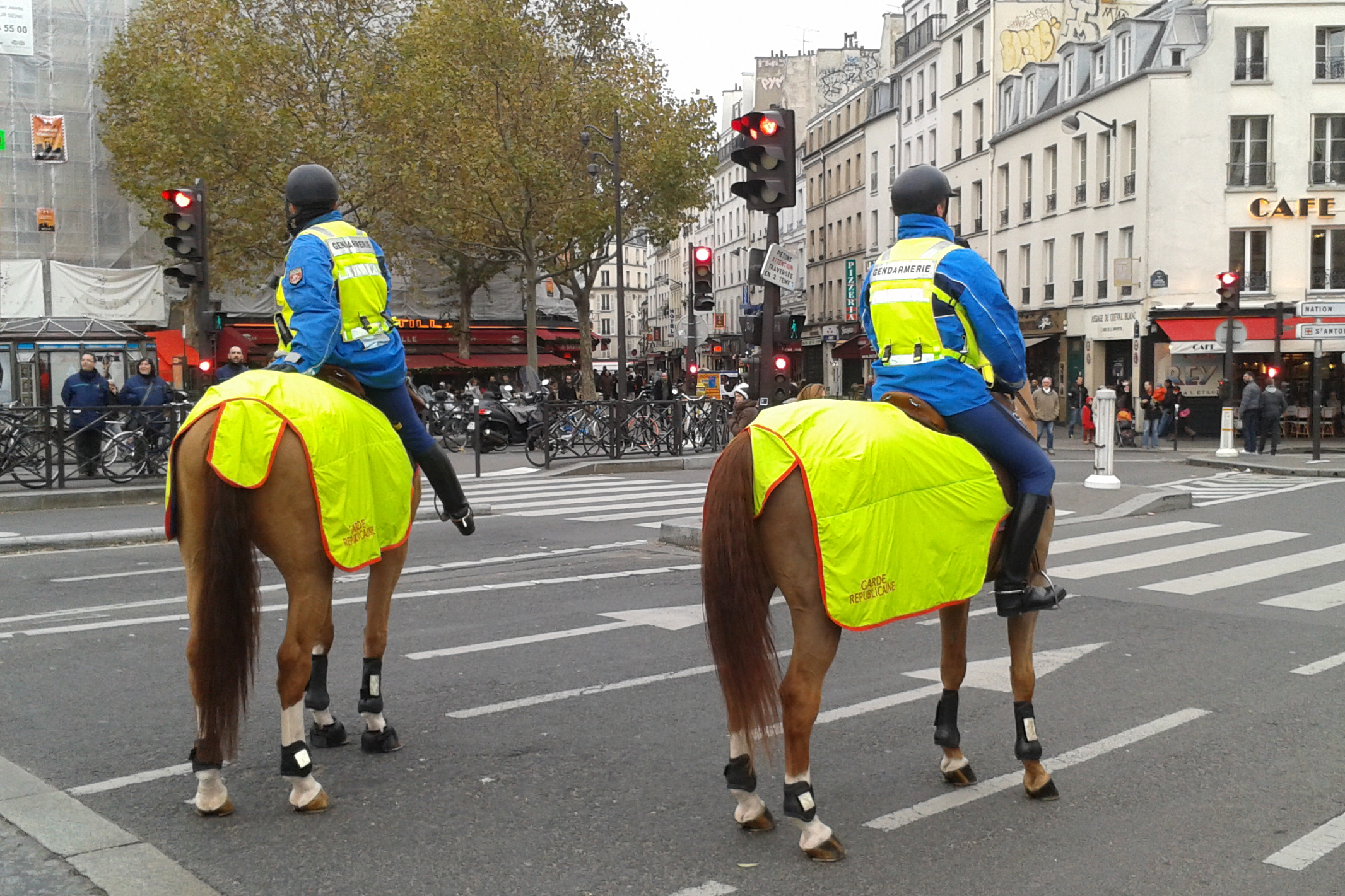
Escorting a rider demonstration in Paris

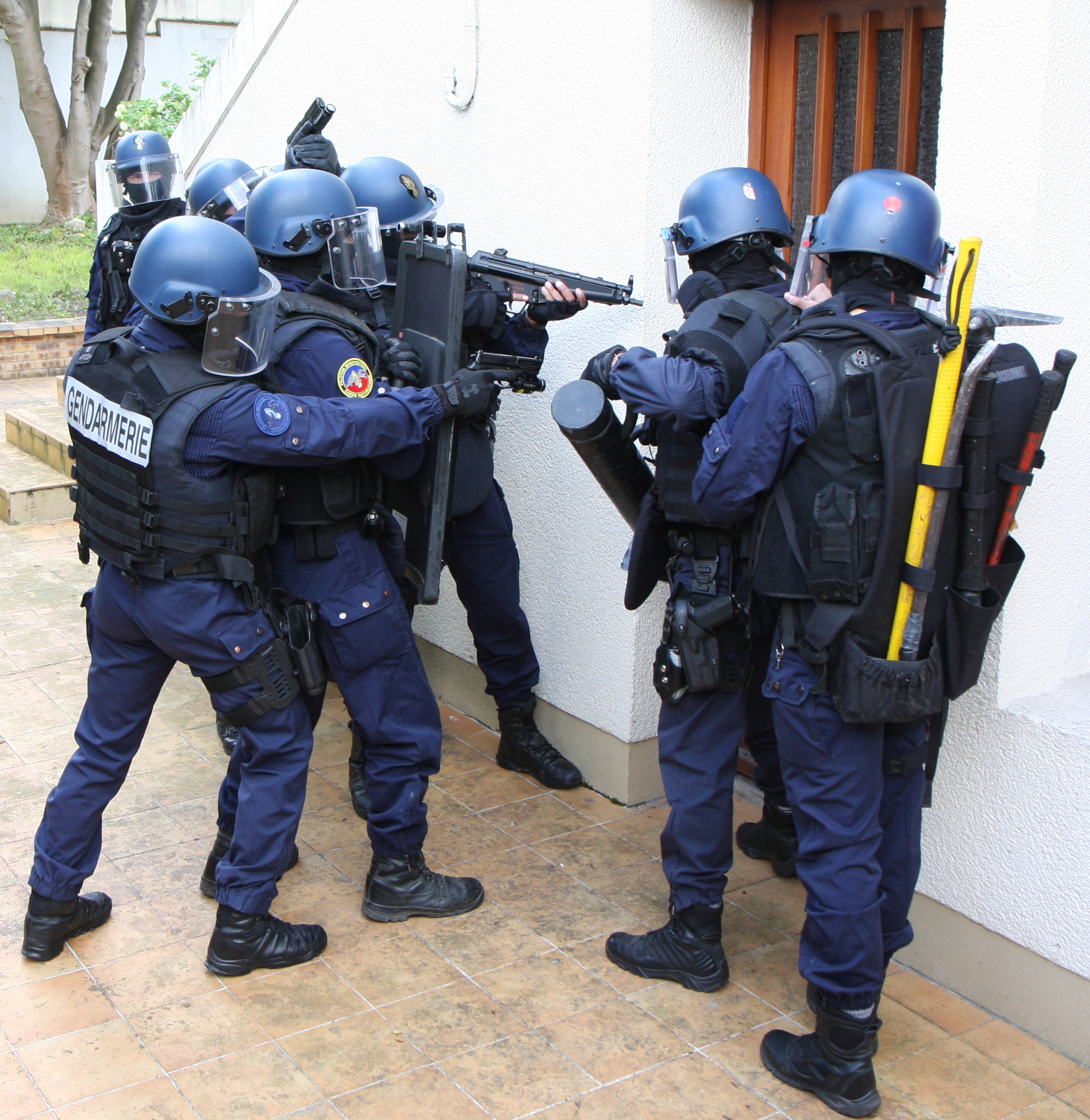
Guard intervention team (peloton d'intervention)

=== Other missions ===
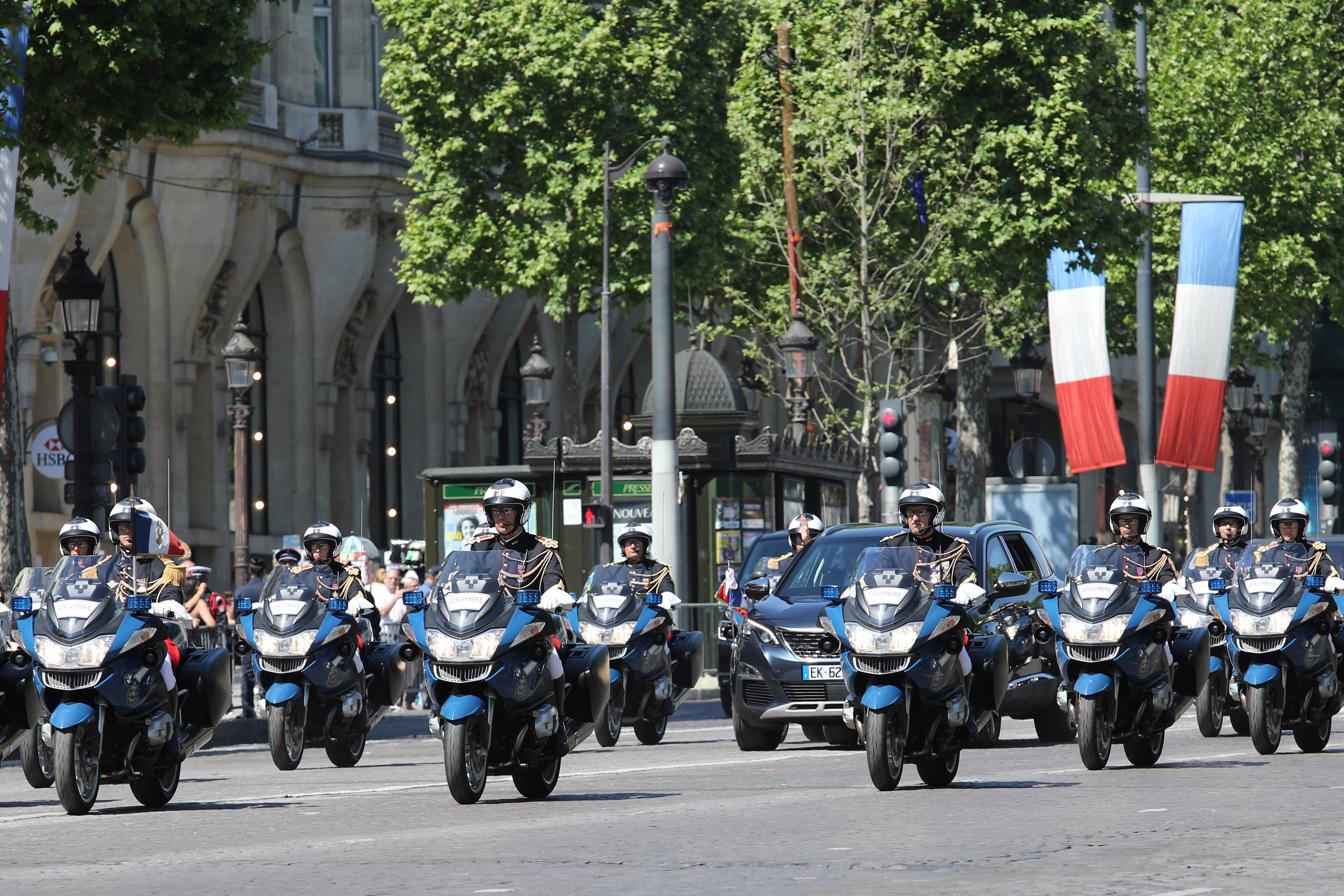
Presidential escort, 8 May 2018

Some guards are assigned to more specific missions:

- Security of diplomatic bags entering and leaving the Ministry for Foreign Affairs and the airports.
- Safety of sport events such as the Tour de France cyclist race by the motorcycle squadron.
- Reinforcement and support to the Departmental Gendarmerie
- Assistance and coopereration in foreign countries and especially in former French colonies.

== Organization ==
The Republican Guard belongs to the French National Gendarmerie. It is made up of approximately 2,800 men and women (drawn from an overall body of 100,000 gendarmes). As a historically Parisian organization, the guards wear the armorial bearings of the city on their uniforms.

It consists of two infantry regiments (one includes a motorcycle squadron) and a horse cavalry regiment. It also has four musical formations, as well as display teams demonstrating prowess in horseback or motorcycle maneuvers. The Guard is commanded by a general de division (major general). It is headquartered in the Quartier des Célestins, (Note: Quartier is used for barracks housing cavalry and other mounted troops while caserne is used for infantry, engineers and non-mounted troops.) Paris, built in 1895–1901, designed by the renowned French architect Jacques Hermant.

=== Cavalry regiment ===
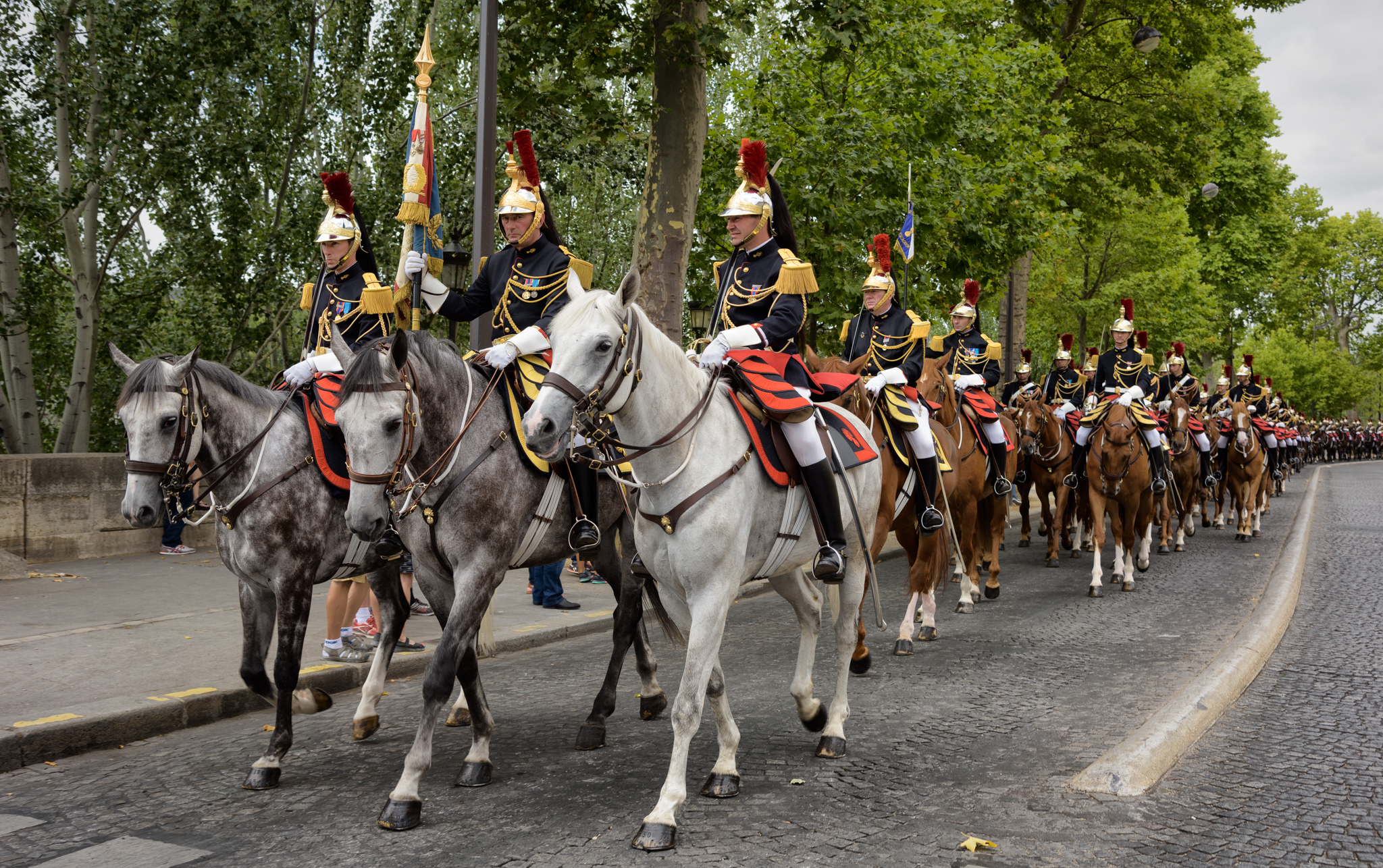
Cavalry

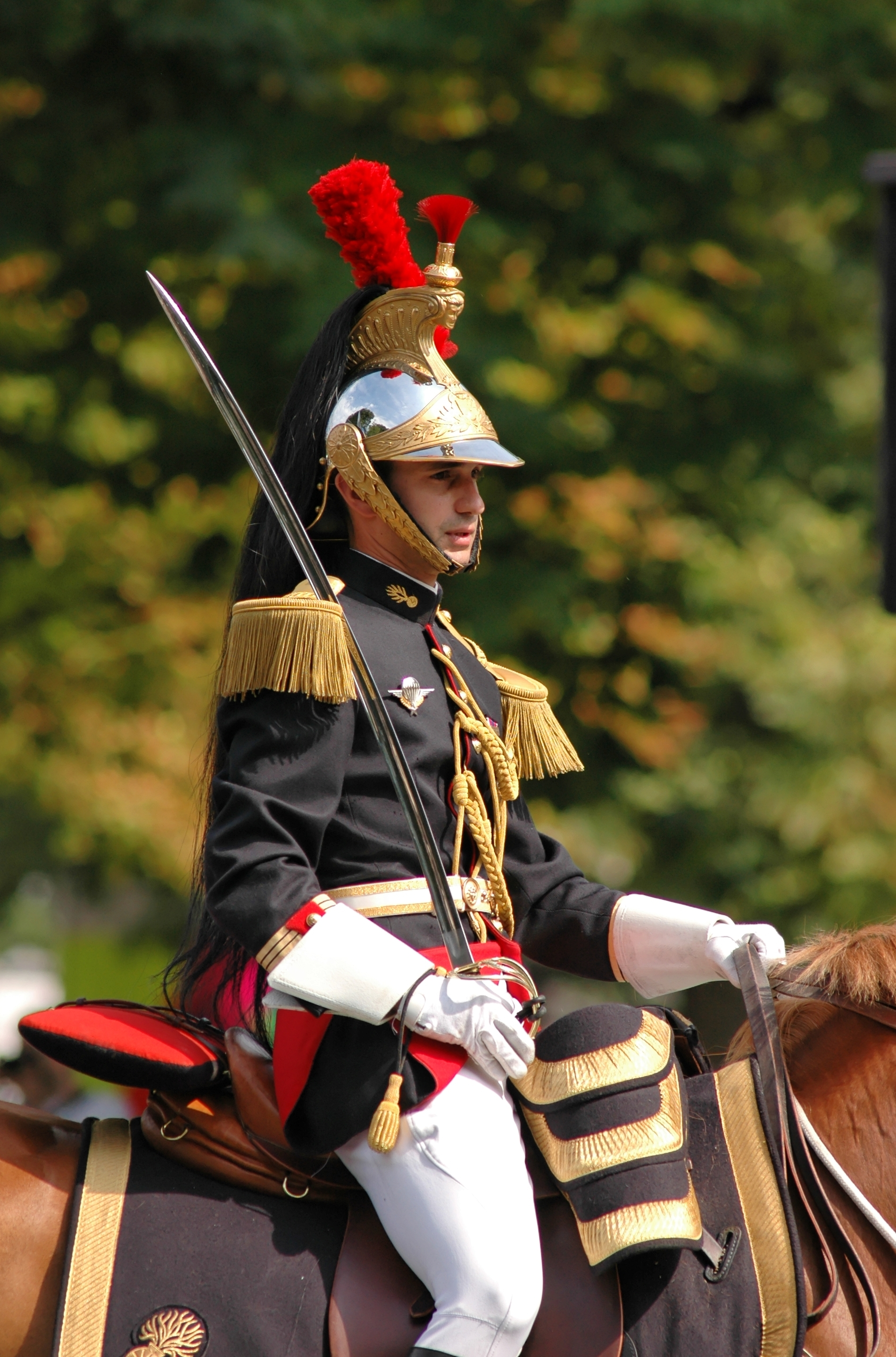
Cavalry officer

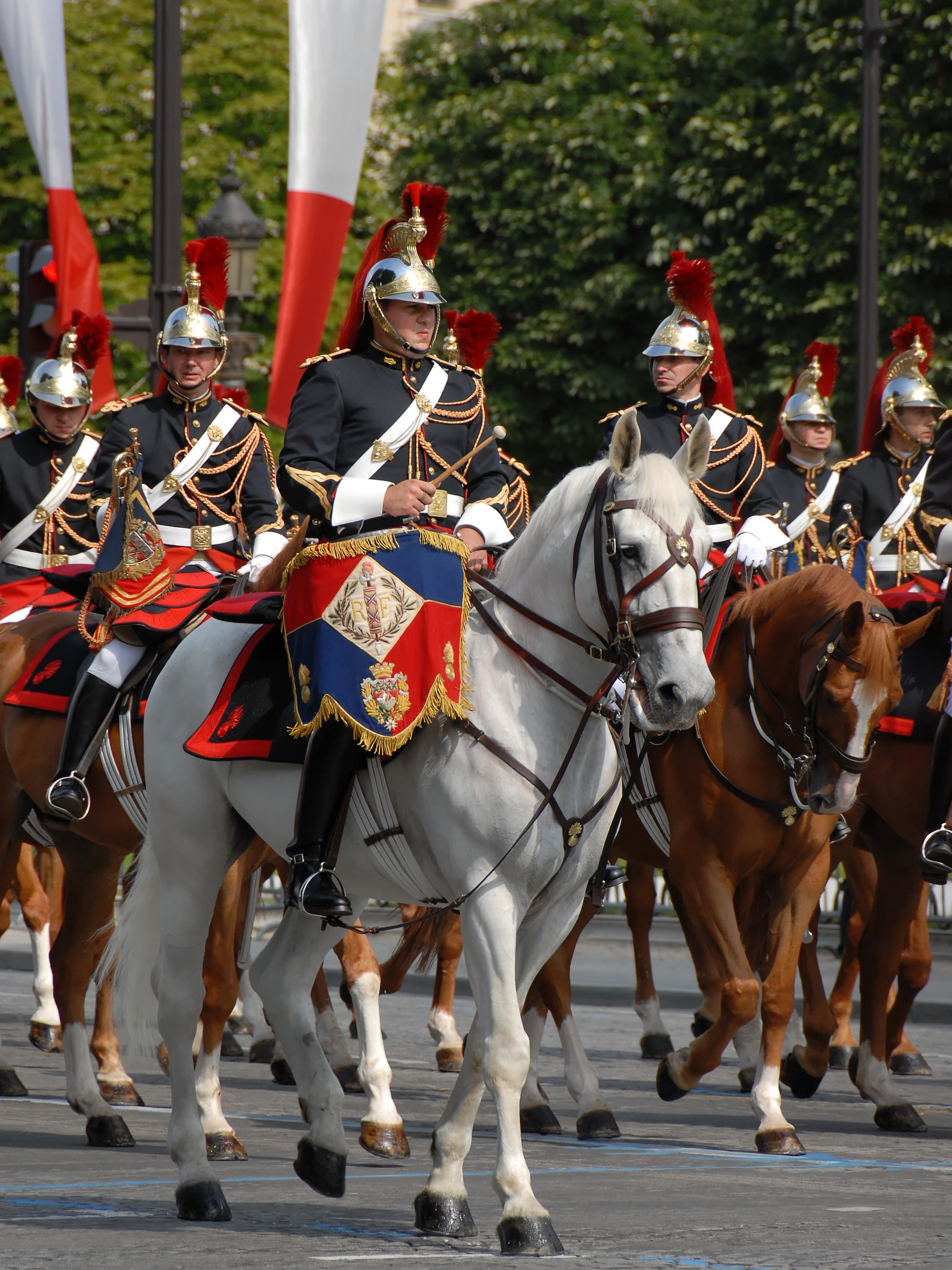
Mounted band

Headquartered in the Quartier des Célestins, and Quartier Carnot barracks the cavalry regiment is made up of approximately 480 gendarmes and civilians of whom a little more than 10% are women. It has approximately 550 horses (11% mares) and, following the disbanding of the Algerian Spahis in 1962, remain the last mounted regiment in the French armed forces.

The regiment is composed of:

- Three squadrons (Note: A French escadron is equivalent to a US troop or a British squadron.) of cavalry (the first is based at Quartier des Célestins, in Paris, and two others based at Quartier Carnot, also in Paris at the fringe of Bois de Vincennes),
- Reserve squadron
- A squadron hors rang (based at Les Célestins) and composed of:
  - mounted band
  - horse-shoeing (farriers),
  - veterinary service.
- The training centre (centre d'instruction) at Quartier Goupil Saint-Germain-en-Laye
- Hunting Horns Platoon (Trompes de Chasse de la Garde)

This unit has a section of high level sportsmen, in particular Hubert Perring, dressage champion of France in 2005, and member of the French team for the World Equestrian Games of 2006.

The Guard Cavalry Regiment is twinned with the British Household Cavalry Mounted Regiment, the Italian Carabinieri Cavalry Regiment and the Senegalese Red Guard.

==== Special displays of the cavalry regiment ====
Exhibition drill squads present five shows and reenactments:

- le carrousel des lances (the lancer's carrousel);
- la maison du Roy (the King's household cavalry);
- la reprise des tandems (the tandem riders);
- la reprise des douze (demonstration/lesson with 12 riders);
- l'équipe de démonstration de sécurité publique (modern mounted police demonstration)
Special displays of the cavalry regiment

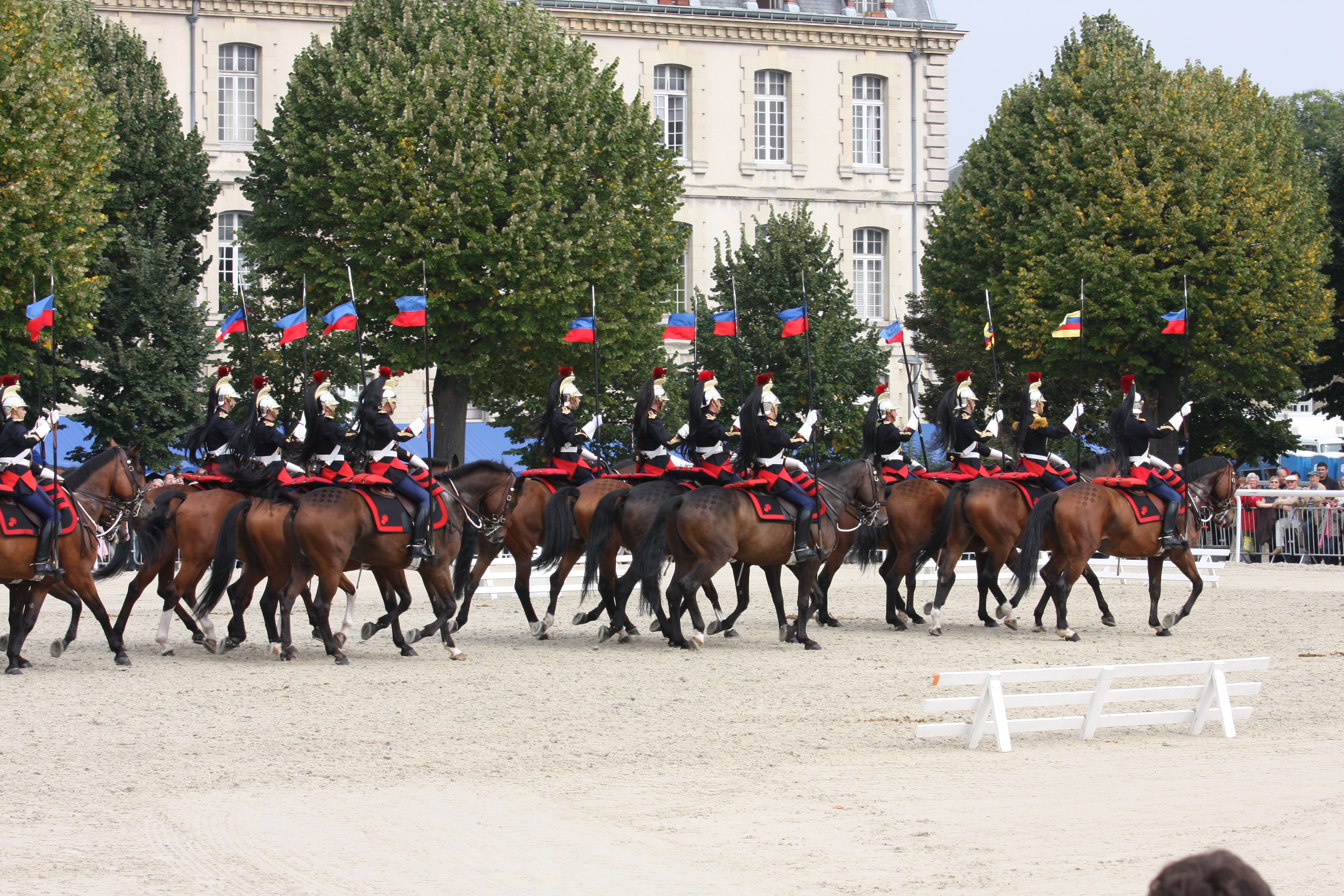
The lancer's carrousel

La Maison du Roy reenactment

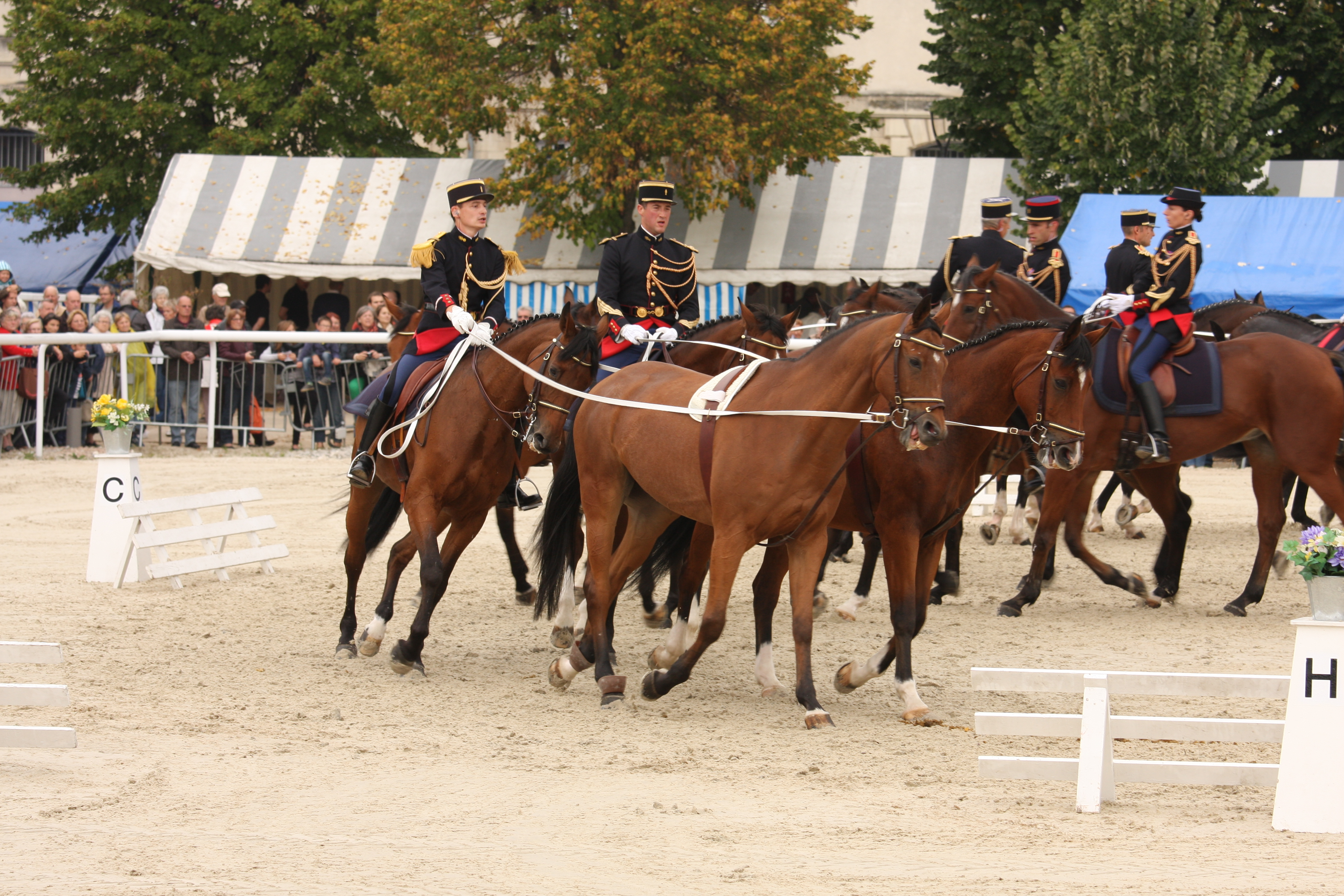
The tandem riders

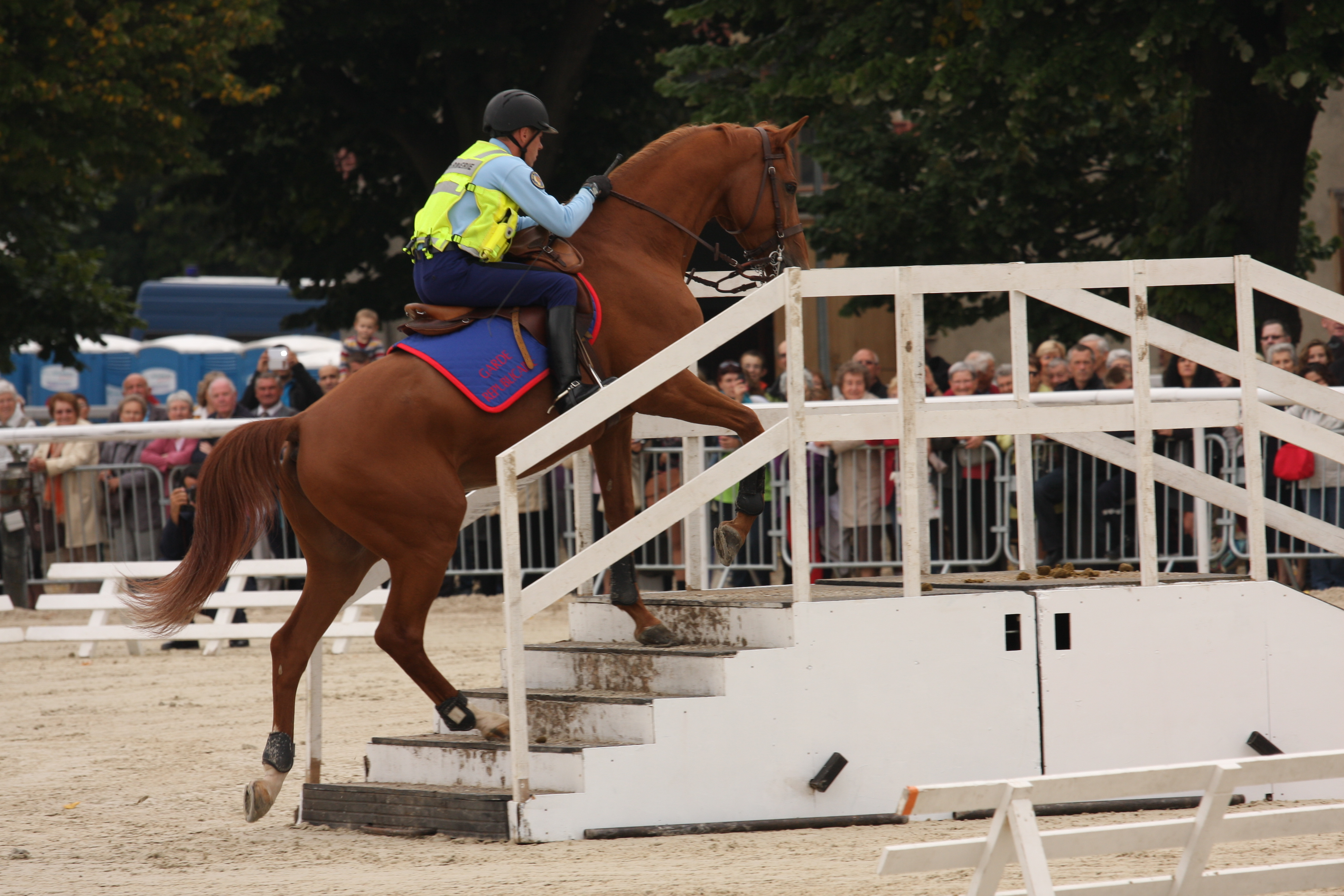
Public security demonstration team

=== Infantry regiments ===
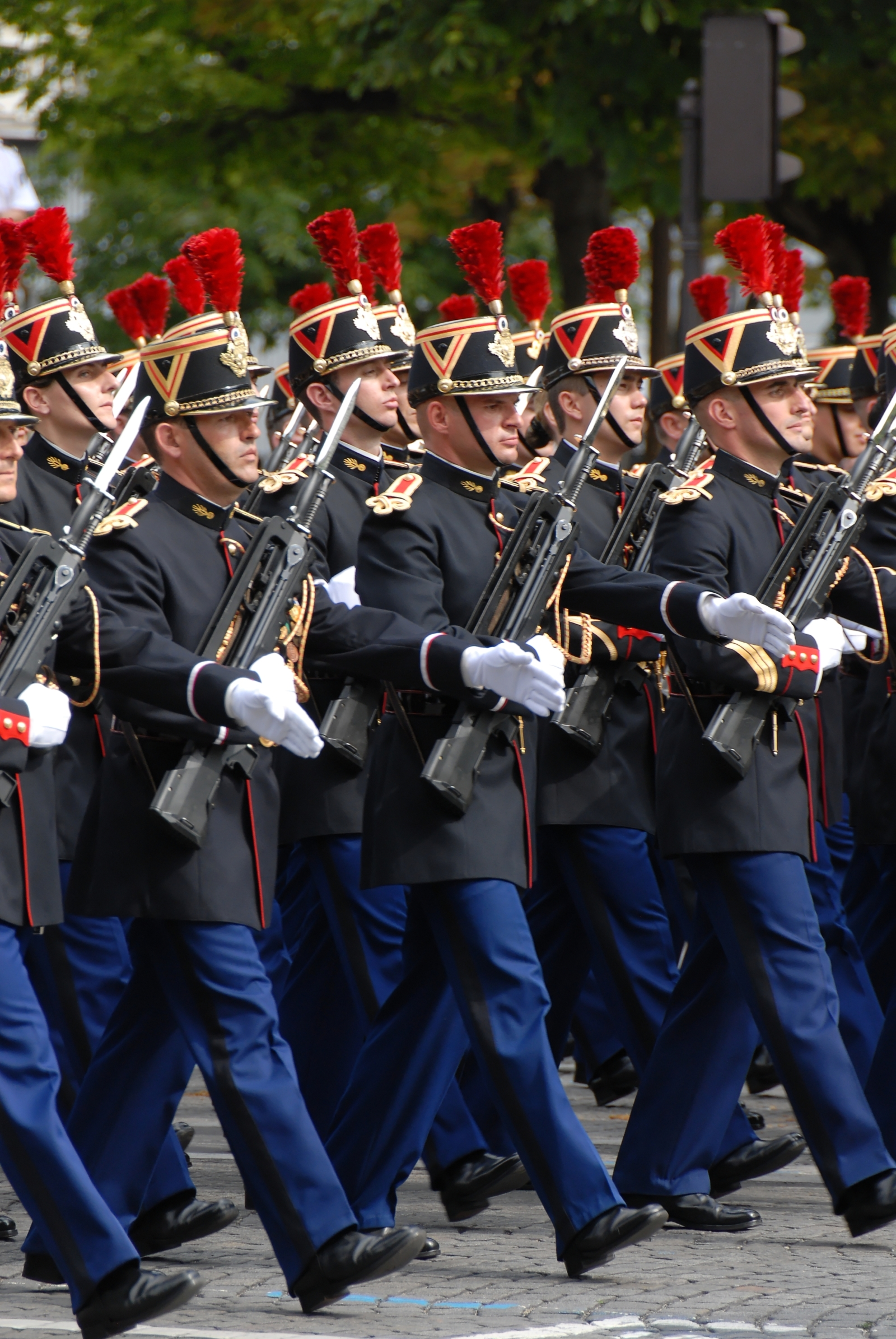
Republican Guard Infantry in ceremonial uniform.

The Republican Guard has two regiments of infantry:

- The first infantry regiment is composed of :
  - Regimental HQ
  - The Republican Guard Band and Bugles (military band and fanfare battery unit)
  - Motorcycle squadron
  - Compagnie de sécurité de la Présidence de la république (presidential palace security company)
  - Three compagnies de sécurité et d'honneur (security and honor companies)
- the second infantry regiment is composed of :
  - Regimental HQ
  - Compagnie de sécurité de l'Hôtel Matignon (prime minister security company)
  - Compagnie de sécurité des palais nationaux (CSPN) (national palaces security company; i.e., national assembly and senate)
  - Four compagnies de sécurité et d'honneur (CSH)
  - Auxiliary platoon

Each of the seven security and honor companies is composed of three regular sections (i.e., platoons) and one peloton d'intervention (intervention platoon). The regular sections perform ceremonial duties and guards. The intervention platoons provide special security in the government buildings and palaces protected by the Guard. They are also tasked with police missions in support of the Gendarmerie in the Paris area (home arrests, escorts etc.). One of the seven intervention platoons is permanently deployed on a rotational basis to either French Guiana in support of forces combating illegal gold mining or to another French oversea territory (typically Guadeloupe or Saint Martin).

==== Special displays of the infantry regiments ====
- Bayonet drill team (quadrille des baïllonnettes; 1st régiment)
- The battery fanfare band
- The Napoleonic Drumline, made up of drummers wearing uniforms of the Napoleonic Wars
- Emperor's grenadiers company, serving as a reenacting unit (2nd régiment)
- Motorcycle display teams
Special displays of the infantry regiments

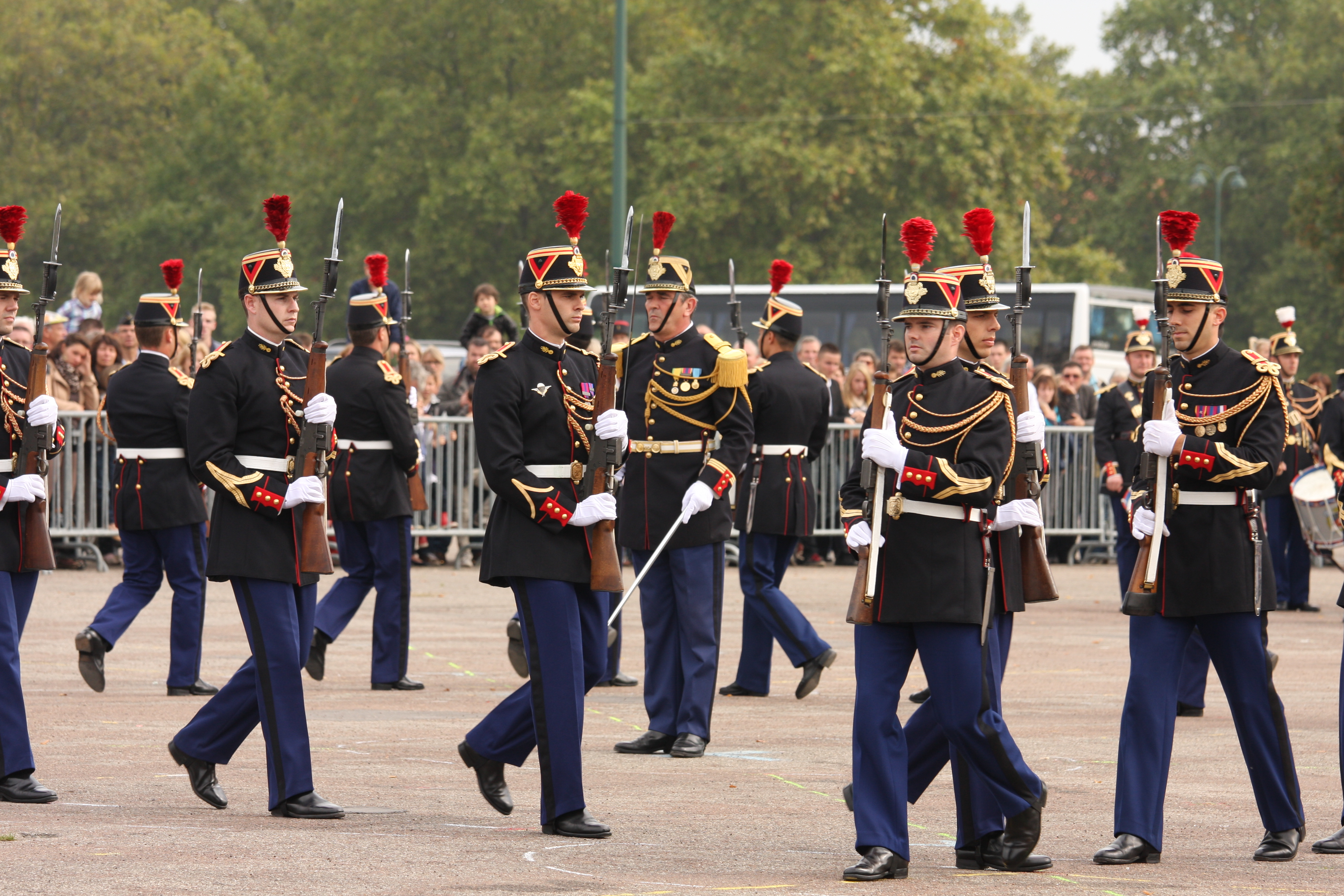
Quadrille des baïonnettes

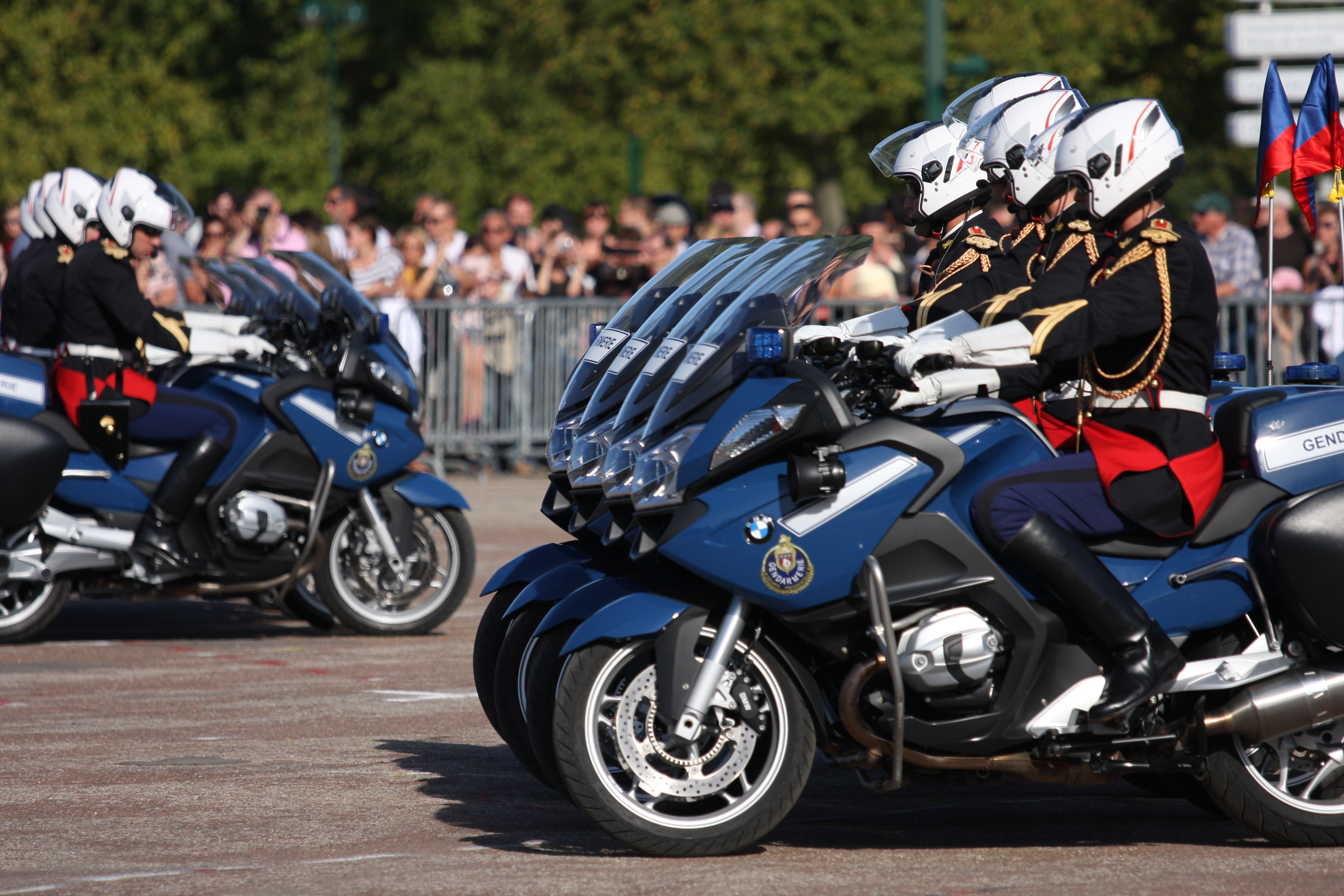
Carrousel motocycliste

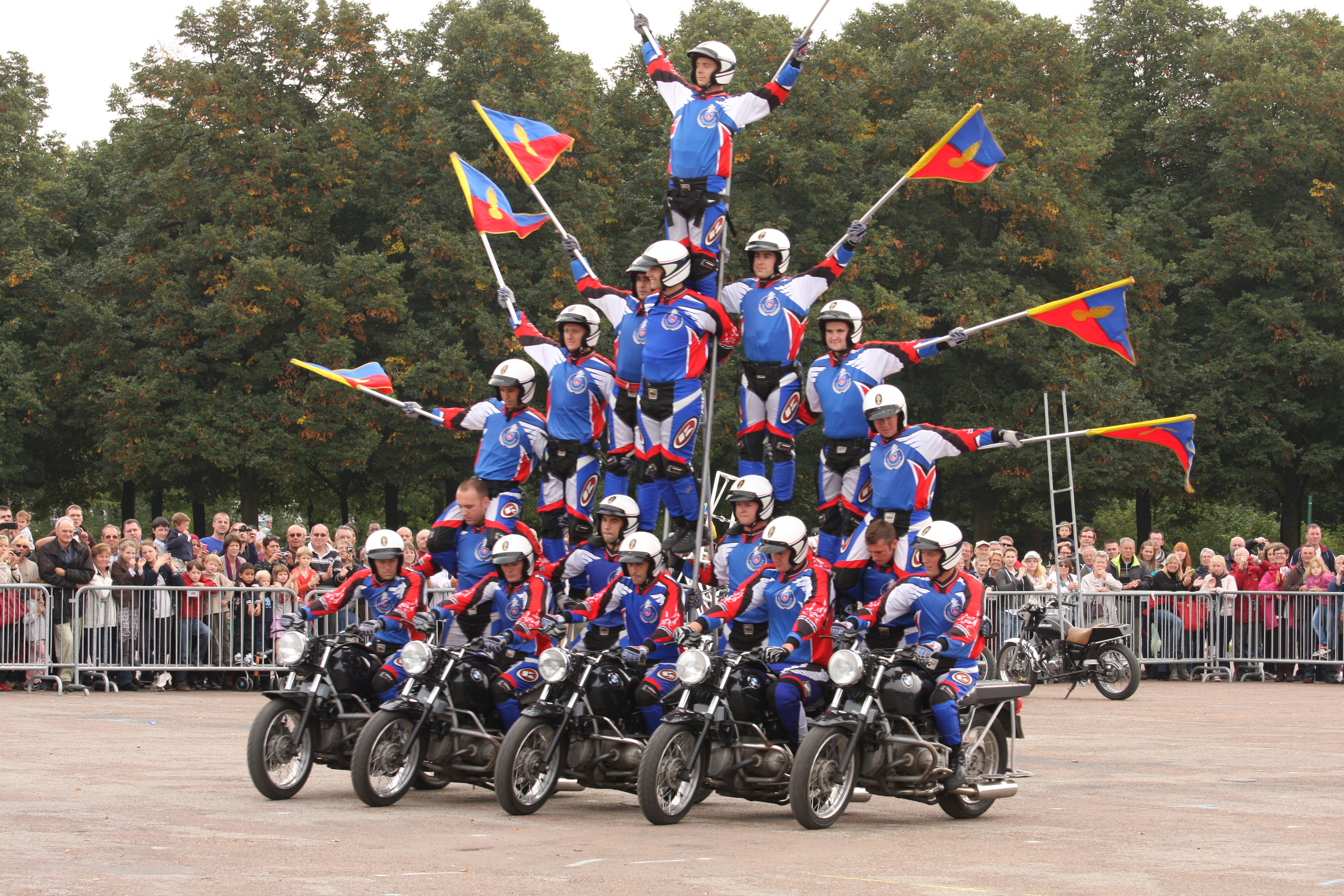
Équipe d'acrobatie

=== Band and Orchestra of the Republican Guard ===
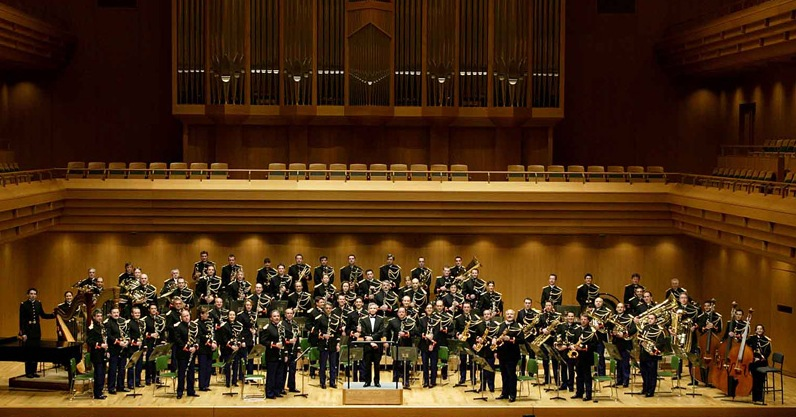
Orchestra of the Republican Guard

Depending on needs, the orchestra performs in three configurations:

- the concert band (80 musicians)
- the string orchestra (40 musicians), likely to be presented in configurations of 24 or 12 bows, or in string quartets
- Symphony orchestra (80 musicians)

It was founded in 1848 by Jean-Georges Paulus.

=== Armed Forces Choir ===
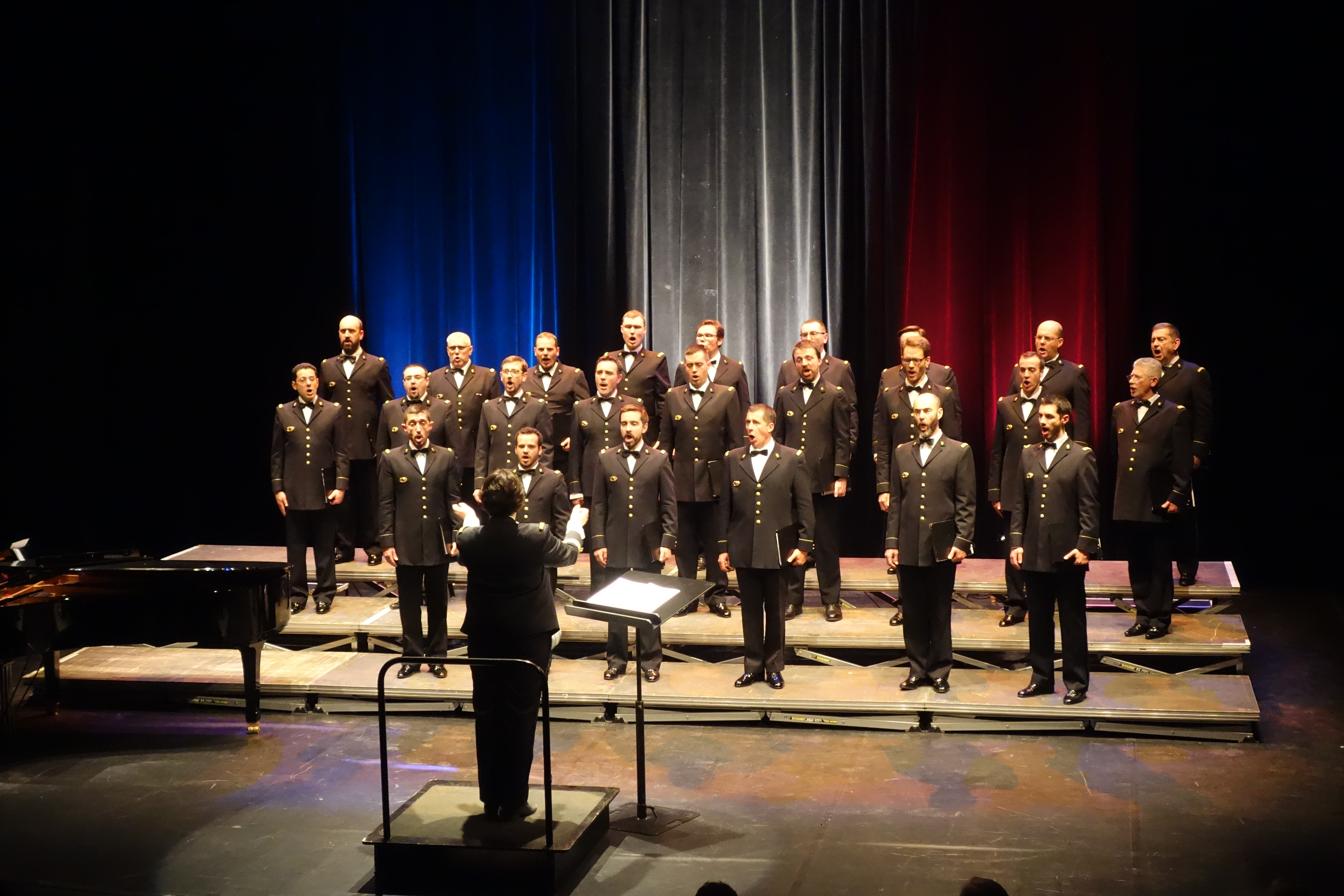
Armed Forces Choir

This men's choir is composed of 46 professional singers. In spite of its name (Choir of the French army), it is part of the Guard and thus reports to the Gendarmerie and through the Ministers of the Armed Forces and Interior (owing to the military character of the service). The choir performs mainly during official ceremonies and commemorations but also during festivals and sport events of national and international importance. Since 2007, it has been led by a woman, Major Aurore Tillac, who serves as choir master and director.

== Commanders of the Republican Guard ==
- 1813–1815: Colonel Bourgeois
- 1815–1815: Colonel Colin
- 1815–1819: Colonel Tassin
- 1819–1820: Colonel Christophe de la Motte Guerry
- 1820–1822: Colonel Tassin
- 1822–1830: Colonel Foucaud de Malembert
- 1830–1831: Colonel Girard
- 1831–1839: Colonel Feisthamel
- 1839–1843: Colonel Carrelet
- 1843–1848: Colonel Lardenois
- 1848–1849: Colonel Raymond
- 1849–1849: Colonel Lanneau
- 1849–1852: Colonel Gastu
- 1852–1855: Colonel Tisserand
- 1856–1858: Colonel Texier of the Pommeraye
- 1859–1862: Colonel Faye
- 1862–1868: Colonel Letellier-Blanchard
- 1868–1870: Colonel Valentin
- 1870–1873: General Valentin
- 1873–1875: Colonel Allavene
- 1875–1875: Colonel Grémelin
- 1875–1877: Colonel Lambert
- 1877–1881: Colonel Guillemois
- 1881–1886: Colonel Azaïs
- 1886–1889: Colonel Massol
- 1889–1894: Colonel Mercier
- 1894–1895: Colonel Risbourg
- 1895–1897: Colonel De Christen
- 1897–1899: Colonel Quincy
- 1899–1902: Colonel Prevot
- 1902–1903: Colonel Doutrelot
- 1903–1904: Colonel Weick
- 1904–1909: Colonel Bouchez
- 1909–1910: Colonel Vayssière
- 1910–1914: Colonel Klein
- 1914–1917: Colonel Brody
- 1917–1917: Colonel Lanty
- 1917–1918: Colonel Brione
- 1918–1922: Colonel Somprou
- 1922–1924: Colonel Pacault
- 1924–1926: Colonel Verstraete
- 1926–1928: Colonel Miquel
- 1928–1930: Colonel Moinier
- 1930–1935: Colonel Gibaux
- 1935–1936: Colonel Maze
- 1936–1938: Colonel Durieux
- 1938–1941: Colonel Ruel
- 1941–1943: Colonel Martin
- 1943–1944: Colonel Pellegrin
- 1944–1944: Colonel Charollais
- 1944–1944: Lt-Colonel FFI Chapoton
- 1944–1944: Colonel Houllier
- 1944–1945: Lt-Colonel Heurtel
- 1945–1948: Colonel Gauduchon
- 1948–1953: Colonel Nicolini
- 1953–1957: Colonel Pelabon
- 1957–1959: Colonel Dorin
- 1959–1961: Colonel Bouchardon
- 1961–1964: Colonel Gérard
- 1964–1969: Brigadier general Dumont
- 1969–1970: Colonel Chevrot
- 1970–1976: Brigadier general Herlem
- 1976–1980: Brigadier general Personnier
- 1980–1984: Brigadier general de la Rochelambert
- 1984–1986: Brigadier general Depardon
- 1986–1988: Brigadier general Hérisson
- 1988–1991: Brigadier general Kretz
- 1991–1995: Brigadier general Lorant
- 1995–1998: Brigadier general Villermain-Lecolier
- 1998–2000: Brigadier general Puyou
- 2000–2002: Brigadier general Prigent
- 2002–2004: Brigadier general Schott
- 2004–2007: Brigadier general Poupeau
- 2007–2010: Divisional general Moulinié
- 2010–2014: Divisional general Schneider
- 2014–2019: Divisional general Striebig
- 2019–2023: Divisional general Bio-Farina
- 2023–present: Divisional general Thomas

== Alliances ==
- Senegal – Red Guard

== Gallery ==
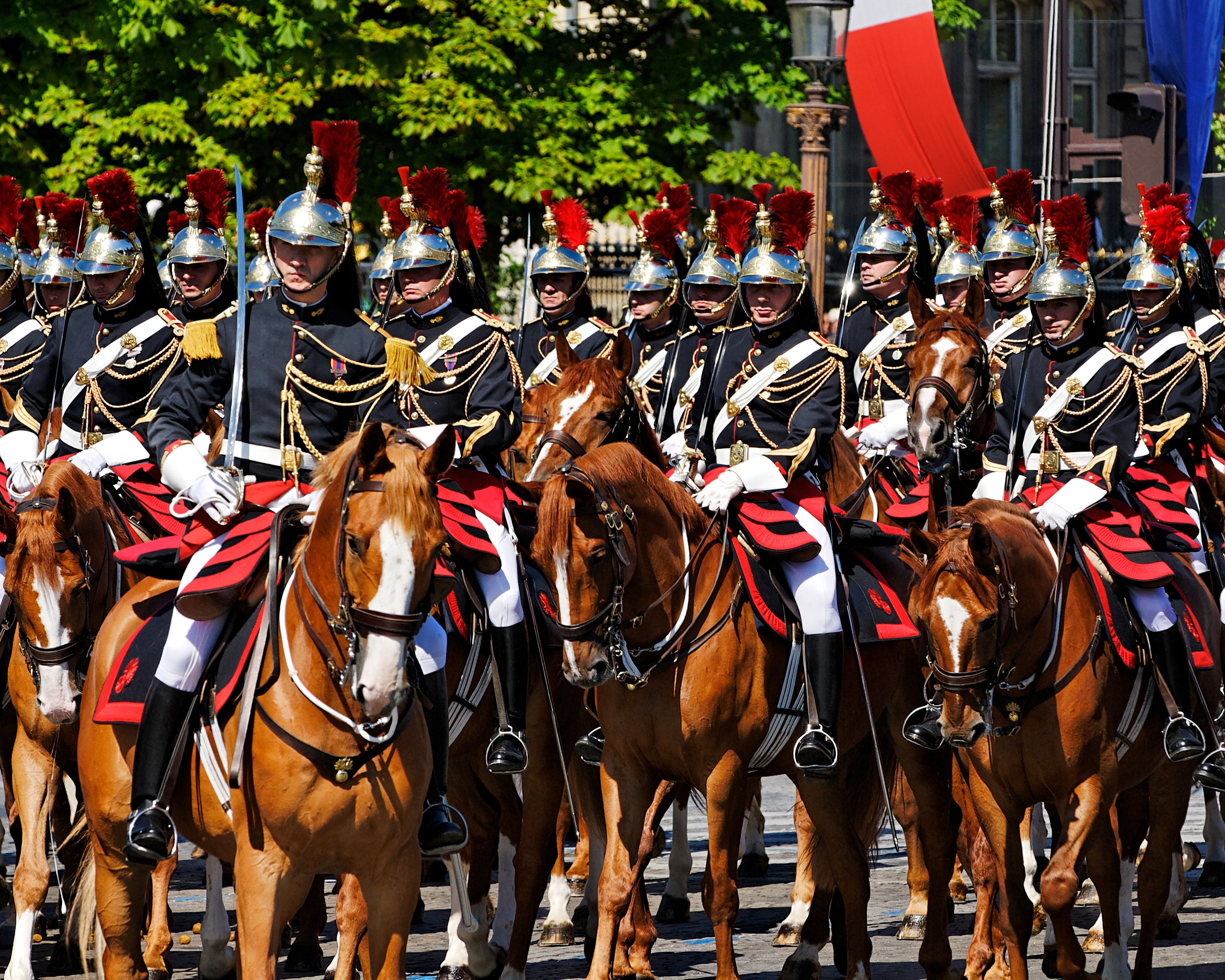
Cavalry of the French Republican Guard - Bastille Day 2008 celebrations

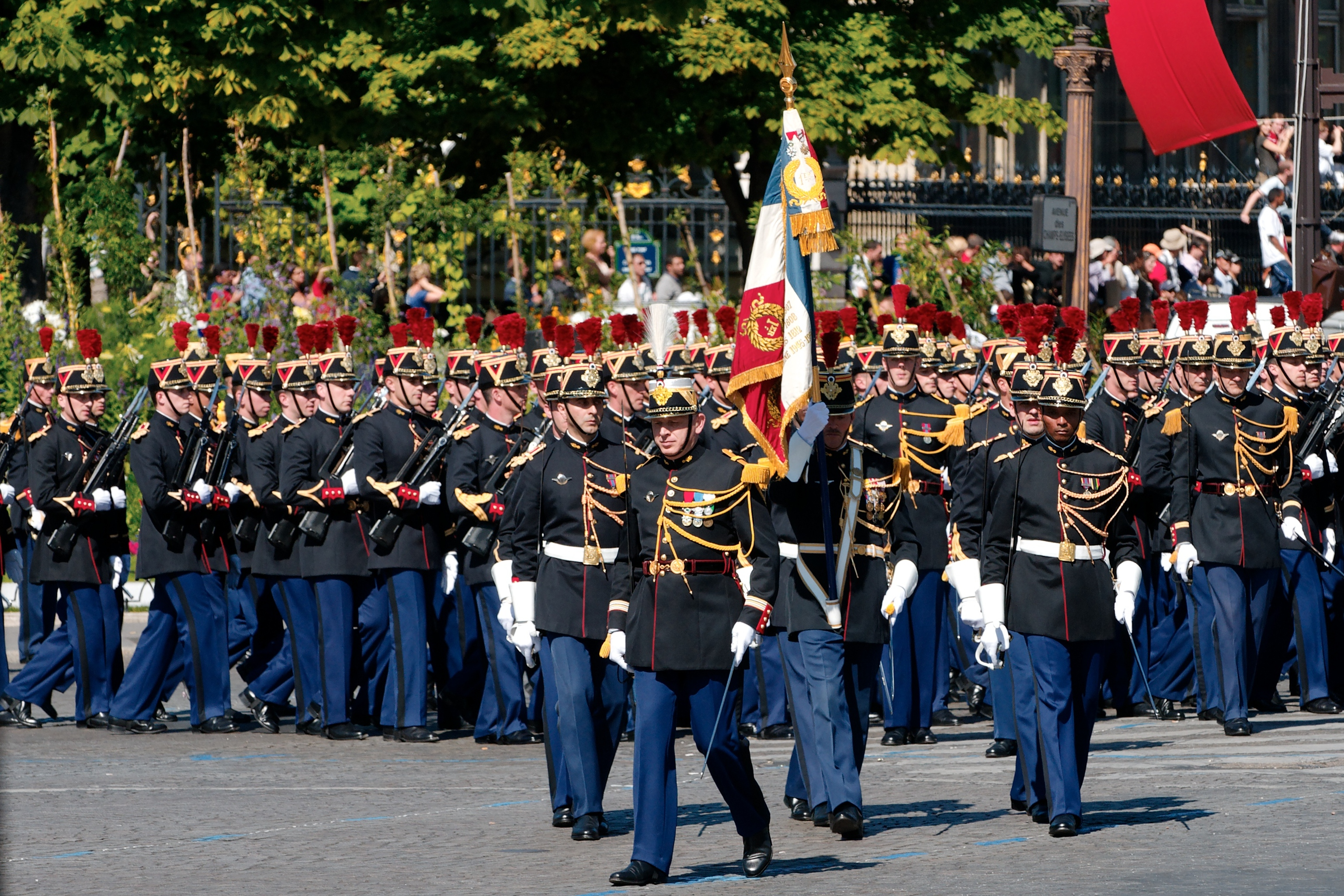
The 1st Infantry Regiment of the Republican Guard during Bastille day

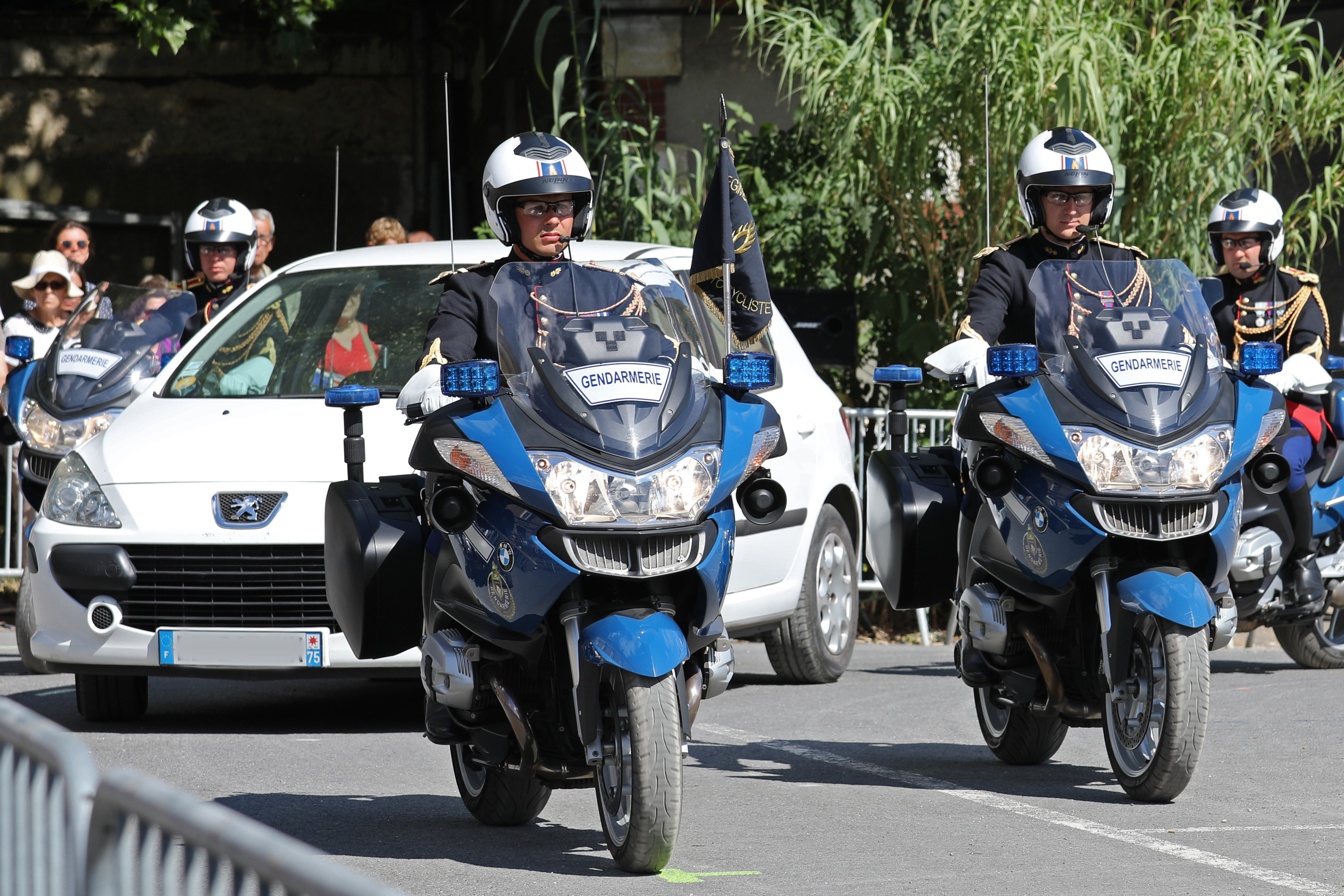
VIP escort

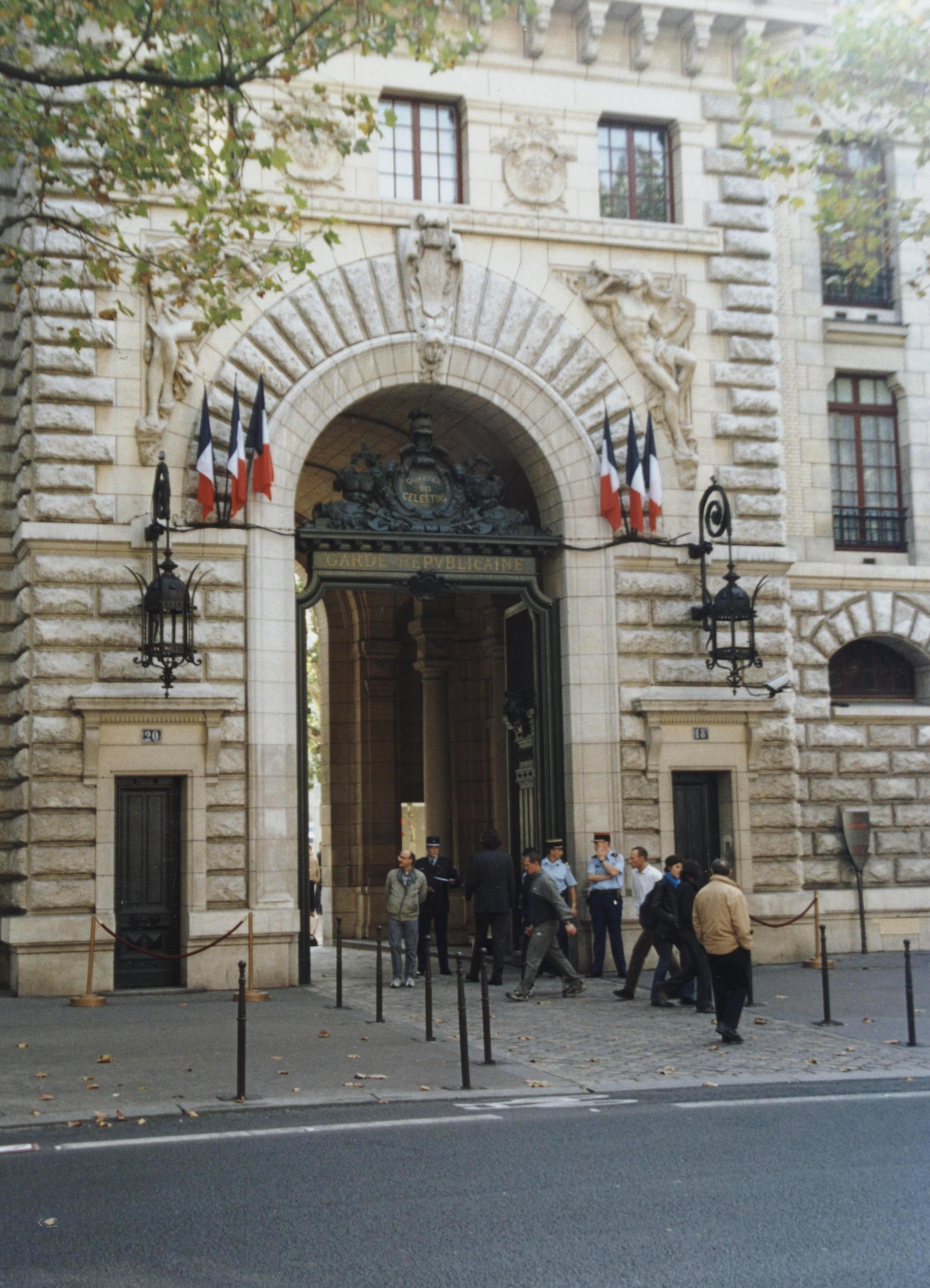
Quartier des Célestins barracks and RG headquarters

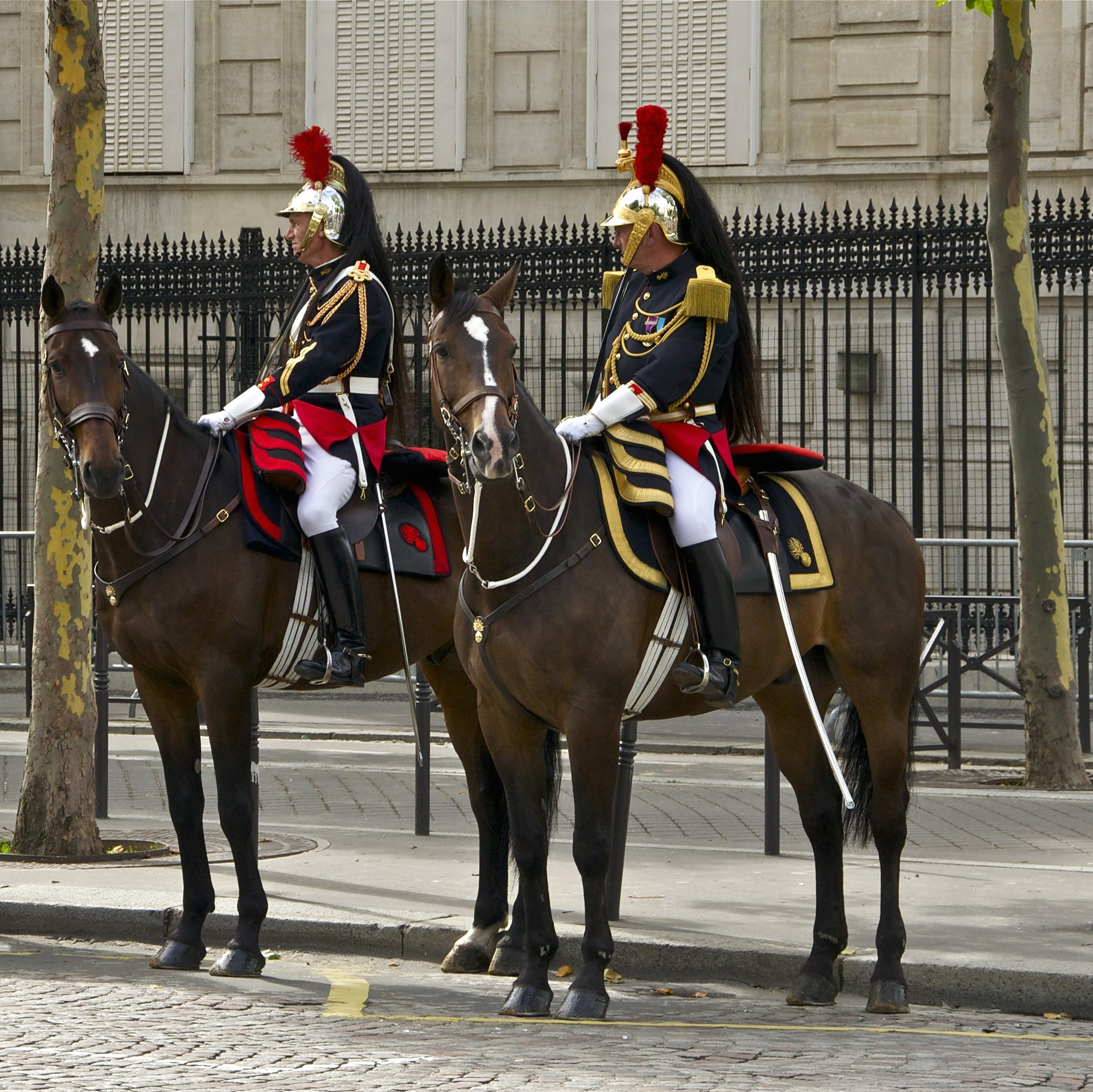
Guard (left) and officer (right) of the mounted Republican Guard

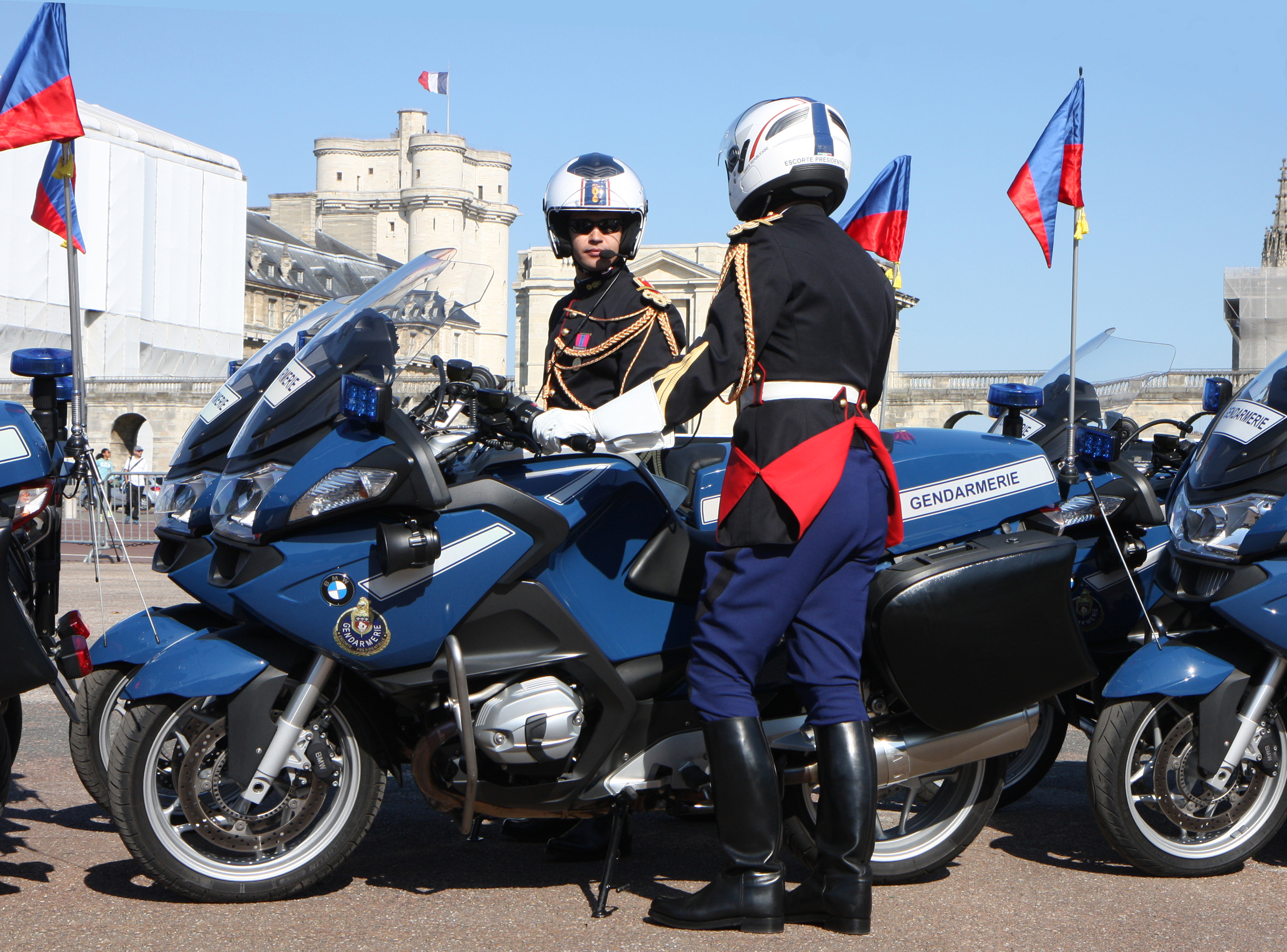
Guard motorcyclists

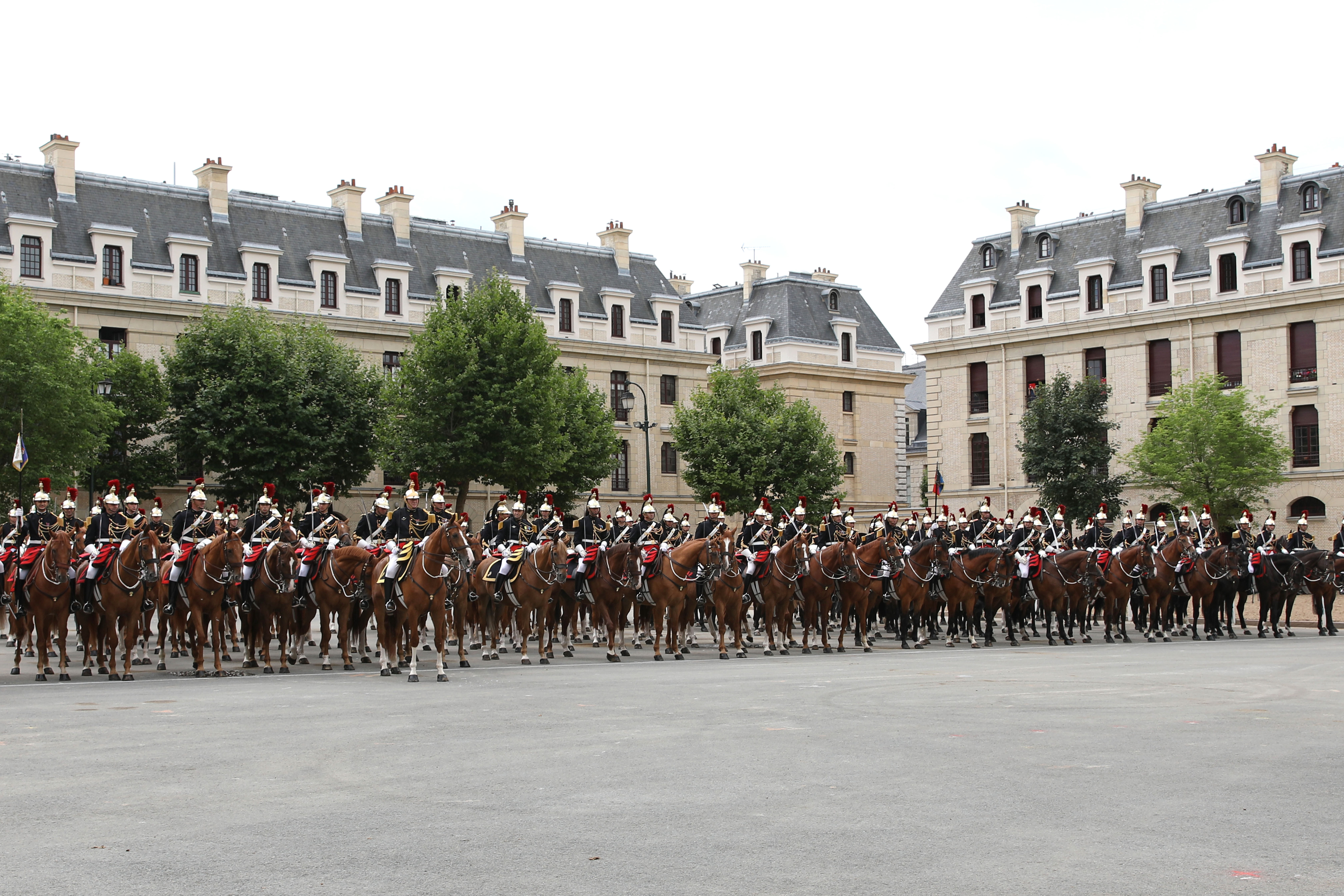
Cavalry squadron gathered on Bastille Day 2017

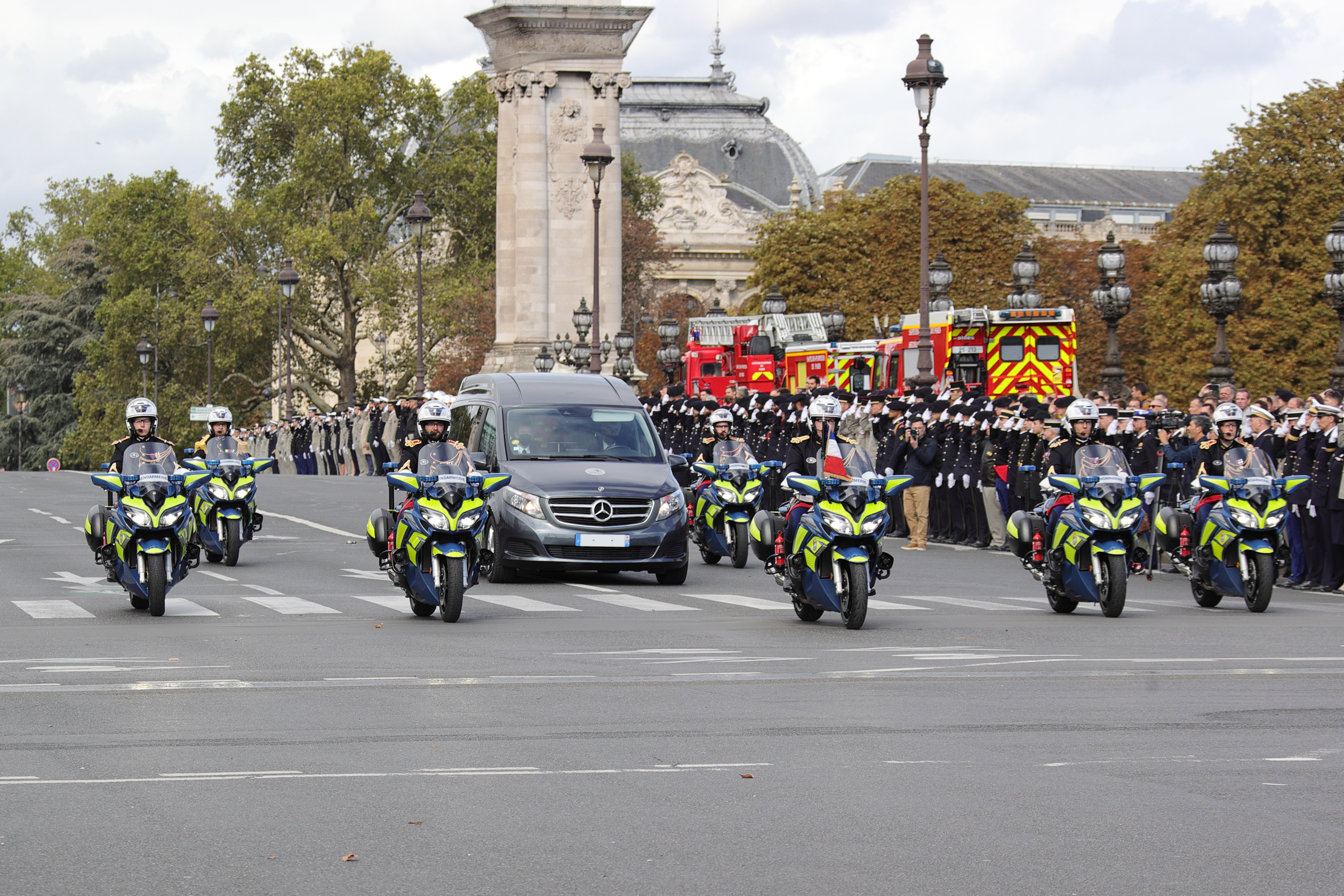
Escorting the body of a soldier fallen in Mali - 2021

== See also ==
- Bastille Day military parade
- Cadre Noir – an equestrian ceremonial unit of the French Army
- Cent-gardes Squadron
- Cuirassiers Regiment (Italy)
- Presidential Guard (disambiguation)
- Republican guard
- Salle des Traditions de la Garde Républicaine
