= Aurore Tillac =

French choir conductor (born 1980)

- Born: 1980 (age 45–46)
- Origin: France
- Occupation: Choir conductor

Aurore Tillac (born in 1980) is a French choir conductor. Since 2007, she has been directing the Choir of the French Army and the Republican Guard.

== Biography ==
Born in Miélan in the Gers department Aurore Tillac was very early passionate with vocal and instrumental music, and particularly traditional music. At age 15, she won the first prize in diatonic button accordion at the festival of Castelnau-Barbarens. At the end of a first training in instrumental and vocal music that she finished at the National School of Music in Tarbes, with a Golden medal and a First prize in clarinet, chamber music and musical training, she studied how to conduct Gregorian chant in the conservatoire de Paris.

From 2002 she became an assistant at the Maîtrise de Paris of Patrick Marco, whose teaching she attended at the Conservatoire à rayonnement régional de Paris, and joined, at the mezzo-soprano pulpit, the Dialogos ensemble, which specializes in medieval music. At the same time she conducts the "Concentus vocal" in a wide repertoire ranging from Gregorian chant to contemporary music and directs the Choir of the Universities of Paris. Since 2007, she has been creating and directing the "Manufacture vocale", a variable geometry ensemble with an eclectic repertoire.

In 2005 she joined the Chœur de l'Armée française à la Garde as assistant conductor and then choir conductor since 2007. She holds the rank of lieutenant colonel.
