= Salle des Traditions de la Garde Républicaine =

Museum in Paris, France

Coordinates: 48°51′05″N 2°21′50″E

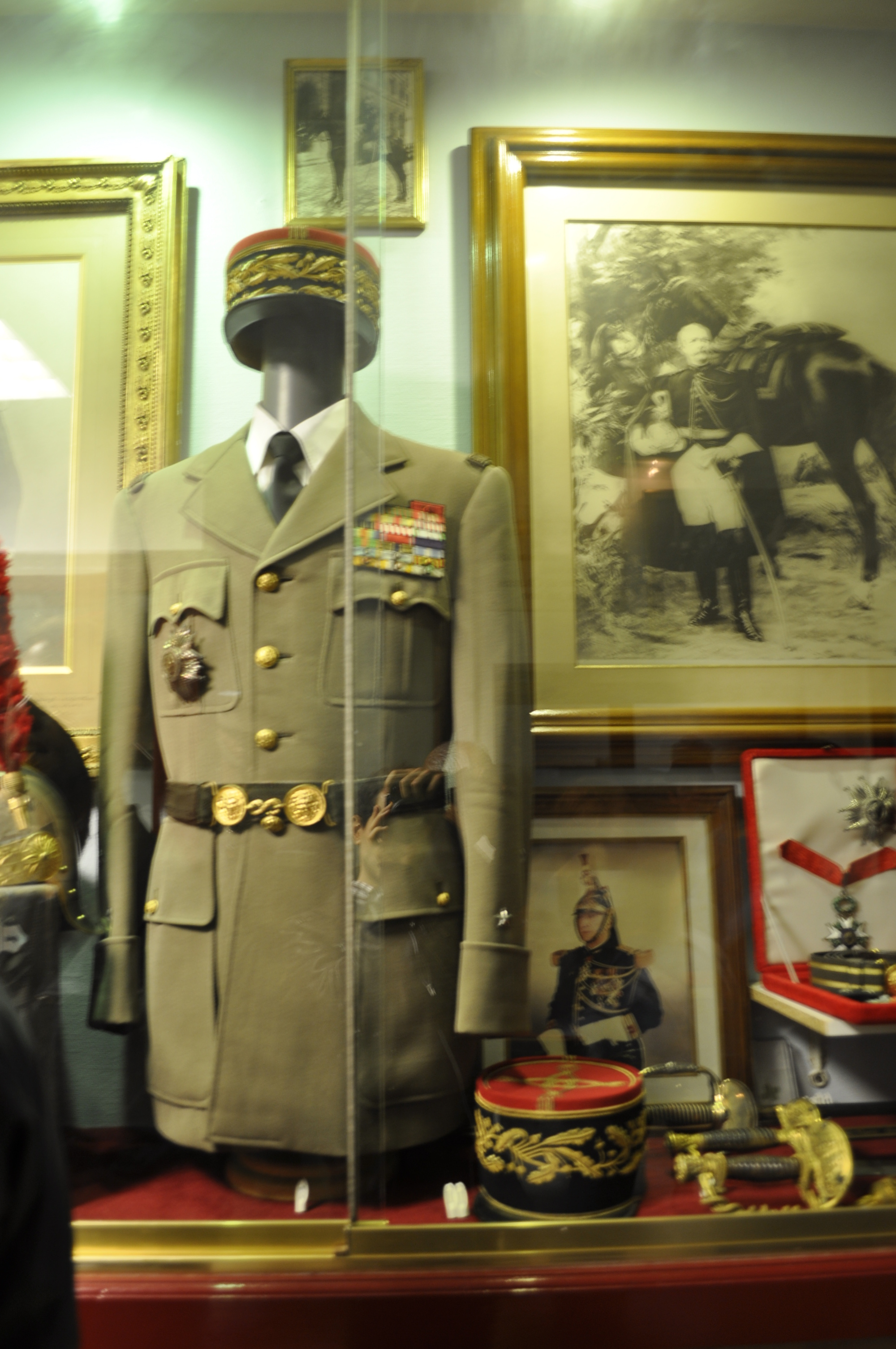
The Salle des Traditions de la Garde Républicaine

The Salle des Traditions de la Garde Républicaine (French pronunciation: [sal de tʁadisjɔ̃ də la ɡaʁd ʁepyblikɛn]) is a museum dedicated to the traditions of the Garde Républicaine, the ceremonial unit of the French National Gendarmerie. It is located in the 4th arrondissement at 18, boulevard Henri IV, Paris, France, and open weekdays by appointment; admission is free.

The museum was created in 1984 in a former stable, and presents the traditions of the Garde Républicaine from 1802 to the present day, including its infantry, cavalry, and military bands. Its collections contain about 1,500 items, such as arms, uniforms, equipment, hairstyles, harnessing, musical instruments, models, documents, etc. A special display honors squadron leader Jean Vérines (fr:Jean Vérines), shot by the Germans for his role in the French resistance.

== See also ==
- List of museums in Paris
