= Choir of the French Army =

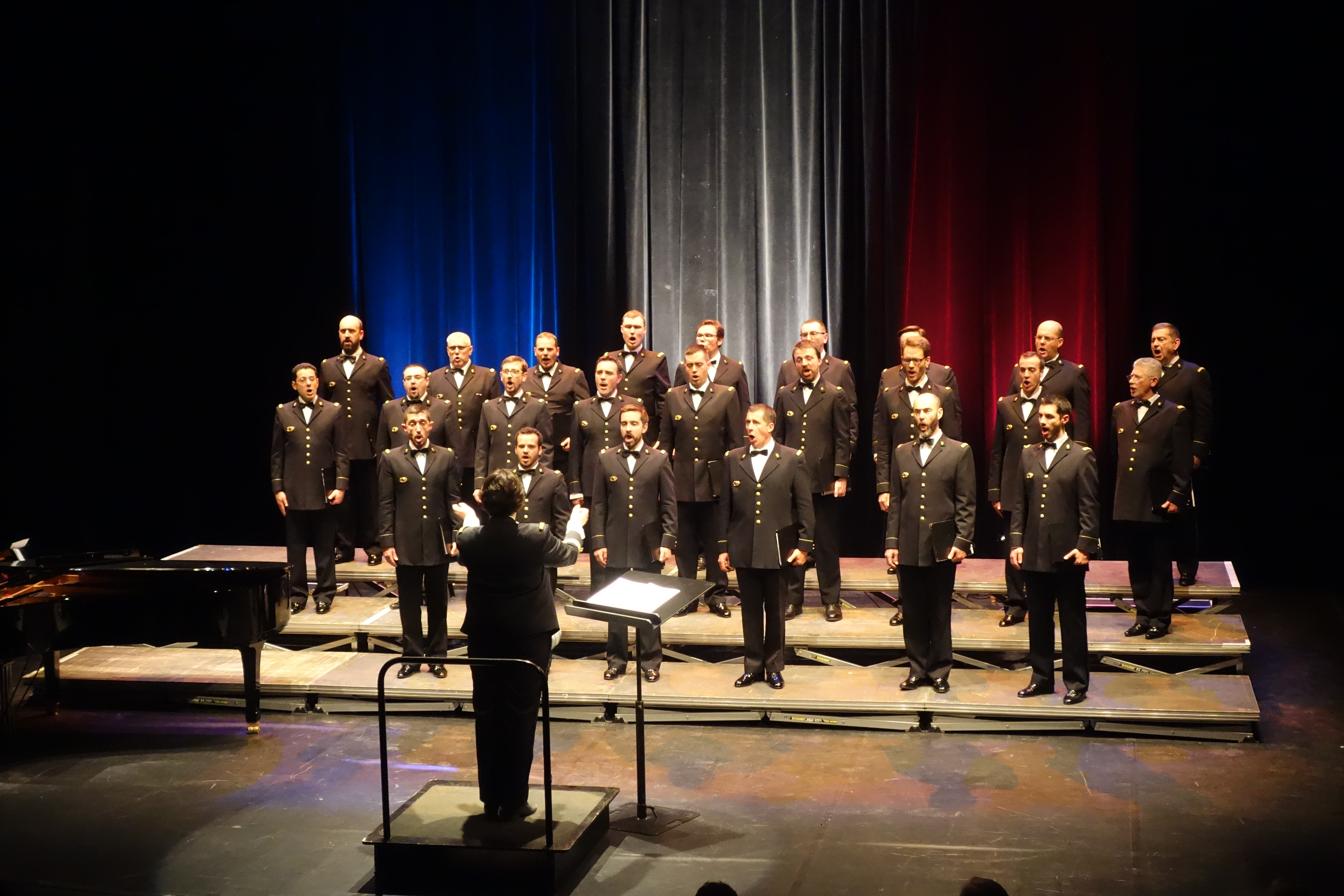
A concert choir at the Lons-le-Saunier Theater

The Choir of the French Army (French: Chœur de l'Armée française), commonly known as the Armed Forces Choir, is an official academic ensemble of the Republican Guard of France. Its current director is Major Aurore Tillac. This male-voice choir is composed of 46 professional singers.

== History ==
It was founded in 1982 by then Minister of Defense Charles Hernu. The first choirmaster of the unit was Hugues Reiner. It became a unit of the Republican Guard in 1994. Its main role is to provide musical accompaniment for state ceremonies and official commemorations.

It has given performances at the Champs-Elysées, at the Opéra Comique, and at the imperial theater of Compiègne. It sometimes accompanies the Band of the Republican Guard during concerts in France and abroad. The repertoire of the choir consists of traditional music, hymns, military songs, religious songs, and partisan songs. Members of the choir performed the French National Anthem during the Bastille Day military parade in Paris on July 14, 2014.
