= The Consular March =

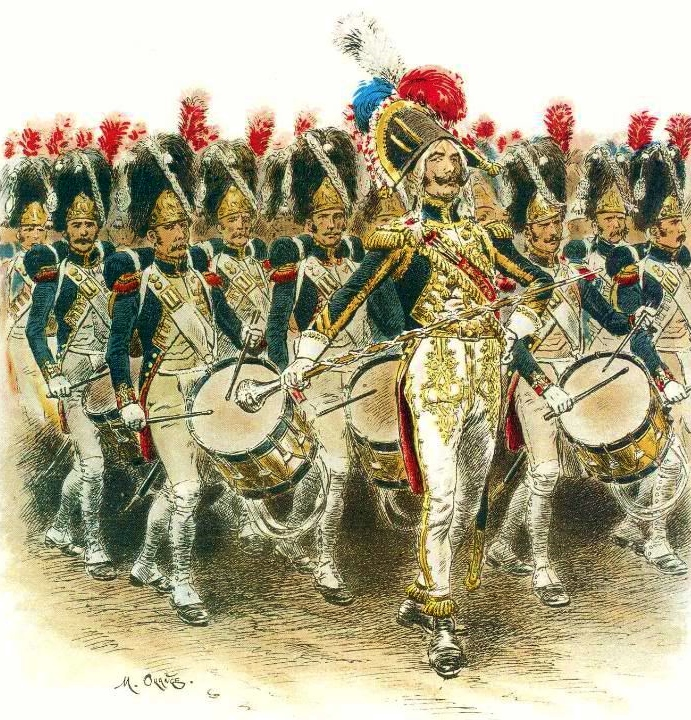
The band of the Foot Grenadiers of the Imperial Guard.

The March of the Consular Guard at Marengo (French: Marche de la Garde consulaire à Marengo), or more commonly known as The Consular March (French: Marche consulaire), is a march composed by Guillardel, head of the band of the Foot Grenadiers of the Consular Guard, during the period of the French Consulate in the French First Republic. This march was named after the 14 June 1800 Battle of Marengo during the War of the Second Coalition, and was probably composed and first performed at that battle, under the title Pas de charge de la Garde consulaire à Marengo.

== Use ==
During the First French Empire, this hymn replaced La Marseillaise as the national anthem, along with Veillons au salut de l'Empire and also the Chant du départ. It is performed at numerous official ceremonies or military parades such as the Bastille Day military parade, and is part of the regular repertoire of the Band of the Republican Guard during the reviews of the Republican Guard guard of honour.

The words of the paratrooper's prayer have been sung to the tune of the Consular Guard March since 1961, at the initiative of a student from the École militaire interarmes. This song has since become the traditional song of the École militaire interarmes.
