= Miélan =

- Commune
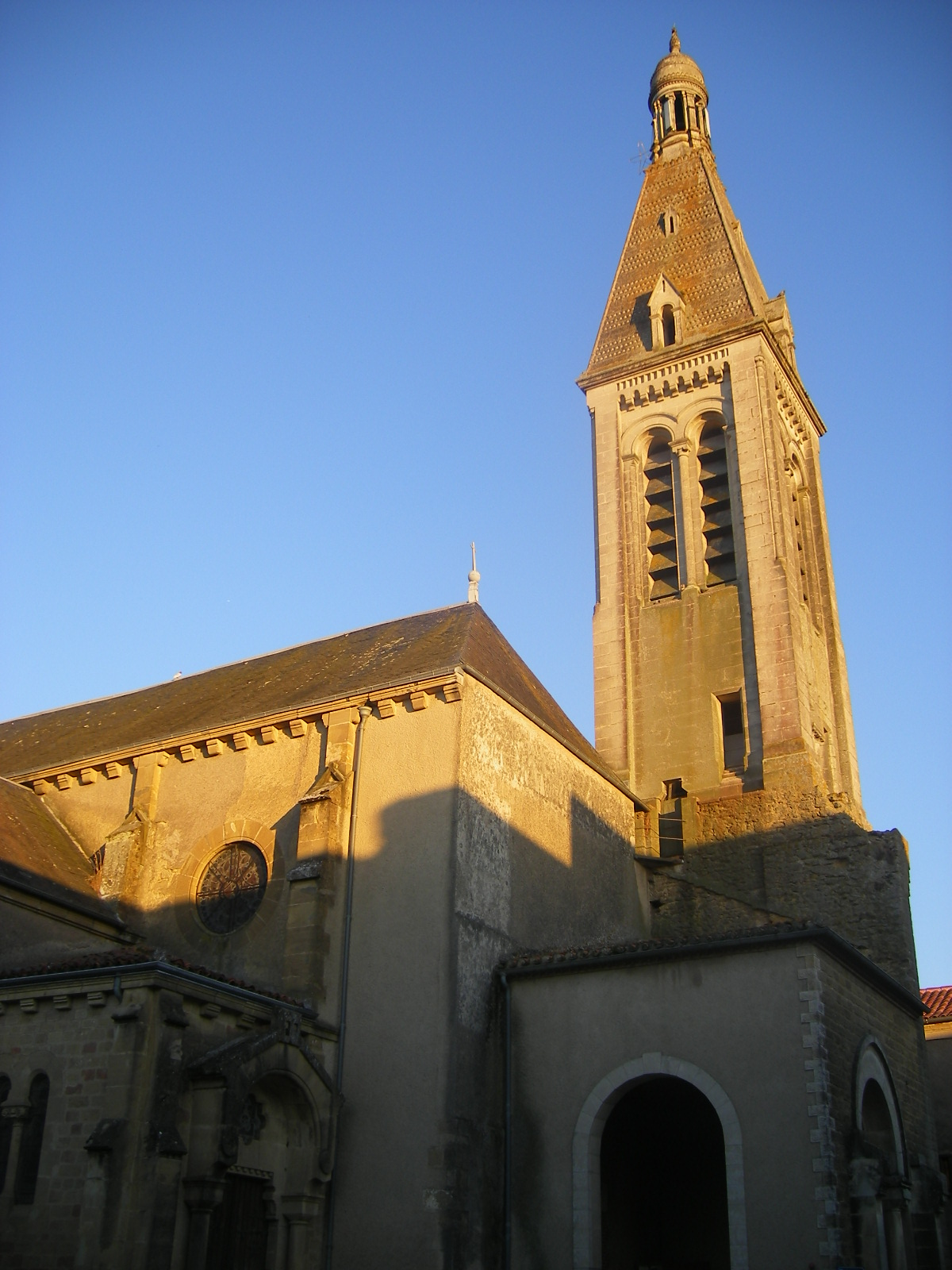
- The church in Miélan

- Coat of arms
- Location of Miélan
- Location within France Location within Occitanie
- Coordinates: 43°25′50″N 0°18′32″E
- Country: France
- Region: Occitania
- Department: Gers
- Arrondissement: Mirande
- Canton: Mirande-Astarac
- Intercommunality: Cœur d'Astarac en Gascogne

Government
  - Mayor (2020–2026): Jean-Loup Arenou
- Area^{1}: 21.88 km^{2} (8.45 sq mi)
- Elevation: 209 m (686 ft)
- Highest elevation: 303 m (994 ft)
- Lowest elevation: 187 m (614 ft)
- Population (2023): 1,129
  - Density: 51.60/km^{2} (133.6/sq mi)
- Time zone: UTC+01:00 (CET)
  - Summer (DST): UTC+02:00 (CEST)
- INSEE/Postal code: 32252 /32170
- ^{1} French Land Register data, which excludes lakes, ponds, glaciers > 1 km^{2} (0.386 sq mi or 247 acres) and river estuaries.

Miélan (French pronunciation: [mjelɑ̃]; Gascon: Mielan) is a commune in the Gers department in southwestern France. The choral conductor Aurore Tillac was born in Miélan in 1980.

== Geography ==
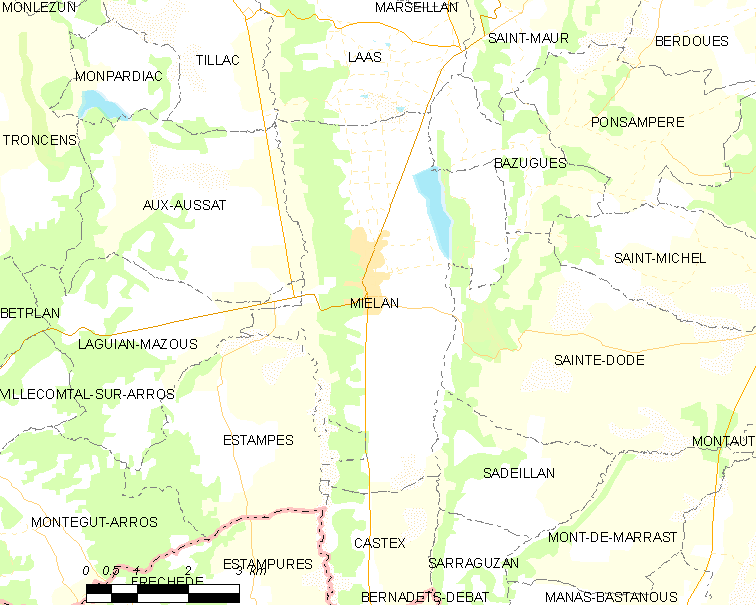
Miélan and its surrounding communes

== Population ==
Historical population
Year	Pop.	±% p.a.
1968	1,295	—
1975	1,325	+0.33%
1982	1,246	−0.87%
1990	1,290	+0.43%
1999	1,258	−0.28%
2007	1,218	−0.40%
2012	1,213	−0.08%
2017	1,139	−1.25%
2023	1,129	−0.15%
Source: INSEE

== Notable residents ==
- Marguerite Dilhan (1876–1956), lawyer, first woman in France to open her own practice and to plead in a criminal Cour d'assises
- Pierre Marie Laurent Forgues (1761-2013), soldier
- Aurore Tillac (born 1980), choir conductor

== See also ==
- Communes of the Gers department
