= Pierre Marie Laurent Forgues =

- Born: 10 August 1761; Miélan, Gers, France
- Died: Unknown
- Military career
- Allegiance: French First Republic; First French Empire
- Branch: French Army
- Service years: 1792–1808
- Rank: Chef d'escadron
- Units: Regiment du Gers; 24eme Chasseurs a Cheval; 12eme Chasseurs a Cheval
- Conflicts: French Revolutionary Wars; Napoleonic Wars
- Awards: Légion d'honneur

Pierre Marie Laurent Forgues (1761–?) was a French soldier of the Revolutionary and Napoleonic Wars.

== Early life ==
Forgues was born in the village of Miélan on 10 August 1761. His father, Jean Pierre Fourgues was a local merchant and his mother, Marie Magdaleine Babart belonged to a merchant family form the village of Montesquieu. Little is known of his early years, but he belonged to an established middle class merchant family who ensured he had a good education so he would be able to fulfil his future role in the family business.

== Military service ==
When revolutionary fervour swept the Midi-Pyrénées in 1792, Forgues felt compelled to join the newly formed Regiment du Gers. His education soon made him stand out from amongst his fellow volunteers and on 21 June 1792 he was appointed a captain in the 3eme Bataillon du Gers, also called the Lectoure battalion.

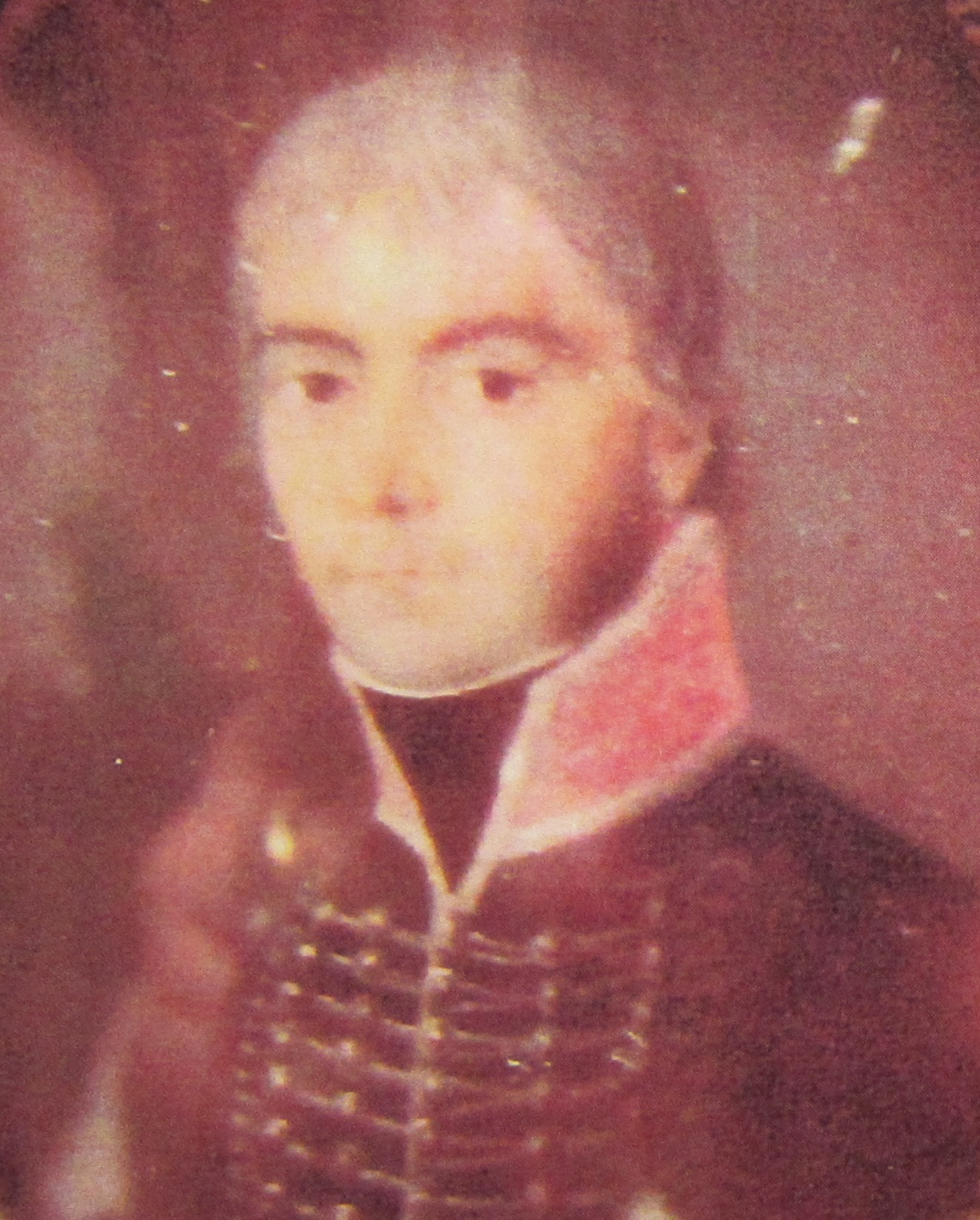
Pierre Marie Laurent Forgues in his military uniform

He was soon noticed for his zeal and his ability and was made adjutant to the Etat Majeur (General Staff) of the Army of the Occidental Pyrenees in September 1792.

Transferring from the infantry to the cavalry, he was promoted to captain in the 24eme Chasseurs a Cheval on the 1er Germinal Year 2 (22 March 1793), he reported to his regiment, stationed in Bayonne which formed part of the Army of the Occidental Pyrenees. With his regiment, and also while attached to the Etat Majeur of the Army, he saw active service at the battle of the Baztan Valley and later at the battle of Orbaitzeta.

The harsh winter of 1794-1795 General Moncey, commander of the Army of the Occidental Pyrenees reorganised his troops and waited for reinforcements for the coming campaign. Disease and lack of equipment and food reduced the troops by some 3,000 soldiers. Forgues was ill during the winter but recovered to continue his duties on the Etat Majeur.

In June 1795 Moncey launched his attack on the Spanish forces, Forgues was present at the capture of Vitoria on 17 July. In August 1795 the Treaty of Basel ended the war between revolutionary France and Spain.

Suffering from illness and campaign fatigue Forgues was sent on leave to recover at his home in Mielan. He was given leave of absence during 1796.

He re-joined the 24eme chasseurs in 1796 when they were ordered to join the Army of Italy. He was transferred to the 12eme Chasseurs a Cheval by Ministerial order on 6 Germinal Year 6 (26 March 1798). He served with his regiment, which was attached to General Schauenburg's division which took part in the operations to "pacify" the Swiss and the subsequent occupation of Switzerland. One Squadron was cantoned in Zurich, the rest were stationed at Winterthur. In March 1799 the regiment and the rest of the Army of Helvetia were placed under the command of General Masséna. The 12th Chasseurs served throughout the 1799 campaign in Switzerland. Forgues distinguished himself in action and was promoted to chef d'escadron on 1st Fructidor year 7 (18 August 1799).

On 1st Germinal year 8 (22 March 1800), Forgues was appointed to act as Aide de Camp to General Dessolles and ordered to report to his new chief in the Army of the Rhine. General Dessolles was Chief of General Staff of the Army of the Grisons under General Moreau.

Forgues served with General Dessolles throughout the campaign of 1800 and 1801. The most important action of the period was the battle of Hohenlinden, fought on 3 December 1800. As ADC to the Chief of General Staff, Forgues was kept very busy throughout the battle. He appears in the painting of the battle that hangs in the Gallerie des Batailles in Versailles.

Forgues was with General Dessolles throughout the campaign until the Treaty of Lunéville, signed on 20th Pluviose, year 9 (9 February 1801) ended the conflict.

General Dessolles was named a Conseiller d'Etat attached to the War Office and later appointed to the Administrative Council of the War Office. His ADC, Forgues did not accompany him to Paris, but remained with the Army of the Rhine, serving with General Mortier who was ordered to occupy Hanover, as stipulated by the Convention of Sulingen, signed on 3 June 1803.

Forgues played an active part in the troops movements that led to the complete occupation of Hanover and the disarming and dissolution of the Hanoverian Army. He formed part of the occupying garrison during 1804. On 12 August 1804 he was awarded the Légion d'honneur, which was registered in the War Ministry in Paris on 21 February 1805.

When Napoleon formed the Grande Armée, and reorganised his army structure, Forgues was employed as ADC on the L'état-major général of the Grand Armee from 20 July 1806 to 2 July 1808.

With the war of the Fourth Coalition starting in 1806 and being primarily fought in Germany, Poland and the Russian frontier, Forgues found himself serving in Marshal Ney's corps, which was detached from Murat's forces to besiege and obtain the surrender of the Prussian forces of General von Kleist that had sought refuge in Magdeburg. The siege lasted from 25 October to 8 November 1806, the Prussians capitulating and evacuating the fortress on 11 November 1806.

Marshal Ney established a garrison in the city, Forgues was made Comandant d'armes of the garrison at Magdeburg.

He remained at Magdeburg carrying out his duties until the Kingdom of Westphalia was formed in November 1807 and Jérôme Bonaparte was made its king.

Forgues then rejoined the L'état-major général of the Grand Armee and continued to serve as an ADC. His health having suffered from campaigning and from wounds received in battle, he returned to Meilan to recover. He was in his village when Napoleon and Josephine passed on their return from Bayonne following the Spanish Abdication crisis in May 1808. On his return trip to Paris, the Emperor stopped at Mielan, where he was greeted by a triumphal arch of flowers and greenery, which was erected on the corner of Fourges's house and spanned the road. A welcome committee formed by the Mayor and the dignitaries of the village were there as well as the population, including Fourges.

Forgues was still listed as active on L'état-major général until 2 July 1808. He was retired from active service and remained in Mielan, where he married twice and had a family. For his loyal services to France, he was rewarded by Napoleon who made him a Knight of the Legion of Honour.

== Later life ==
From 1813 to 1815 Forgues was in Tarbes, where he held the post of Entreposeur Principal of the department of Hautes-Pyrénées. This was a government administrative post where he supervised all the moments of state regulated goods (i.e. tobacco).

In 1816 Fourges returned to Meilan, where he wrote to the Minister of War and requested his Imperial Legion of Honour with its privileges, being confirmed by the restored Louis XVIII.

== Campaigns ==
- Armee des Pyrenees Occidentals, 21 June 1792 to 27 September 1796.
- 26 March 1798 (6 Germinal year 6) to 1801 March 28 (7 germinal year 9).
- Armee des Grischons and du Rhin, 28 December 1799 to 4 May 1801, under Général Moreau.
- Battle of Hohenlinden, 3 December 1800.
- Occupation of Hanover during the revolutionary years 11 and 12 (1803 and 1804).
- Officer of the General Staff of the Grand Armee between 20 July 1806 and 2 July 1808.
- Comandante d'armes of the Garrison at Magdeburg.
