= List of religious buildings in Paris =

This is a list of religious buildings in Paris, organized by religion and then by arrondissement (administrative division or district).

A map of the churches founded in Paris from AD 500 to AD 1790

== Buddhism ==
- 12th arrondissement:
  - Pagode de Vincennes, in the Bois de Vincennes
- 13th arrondissement:
  - Two pagodas in the Asian quarter

== Christianity ==
=== Anglican Communion ===
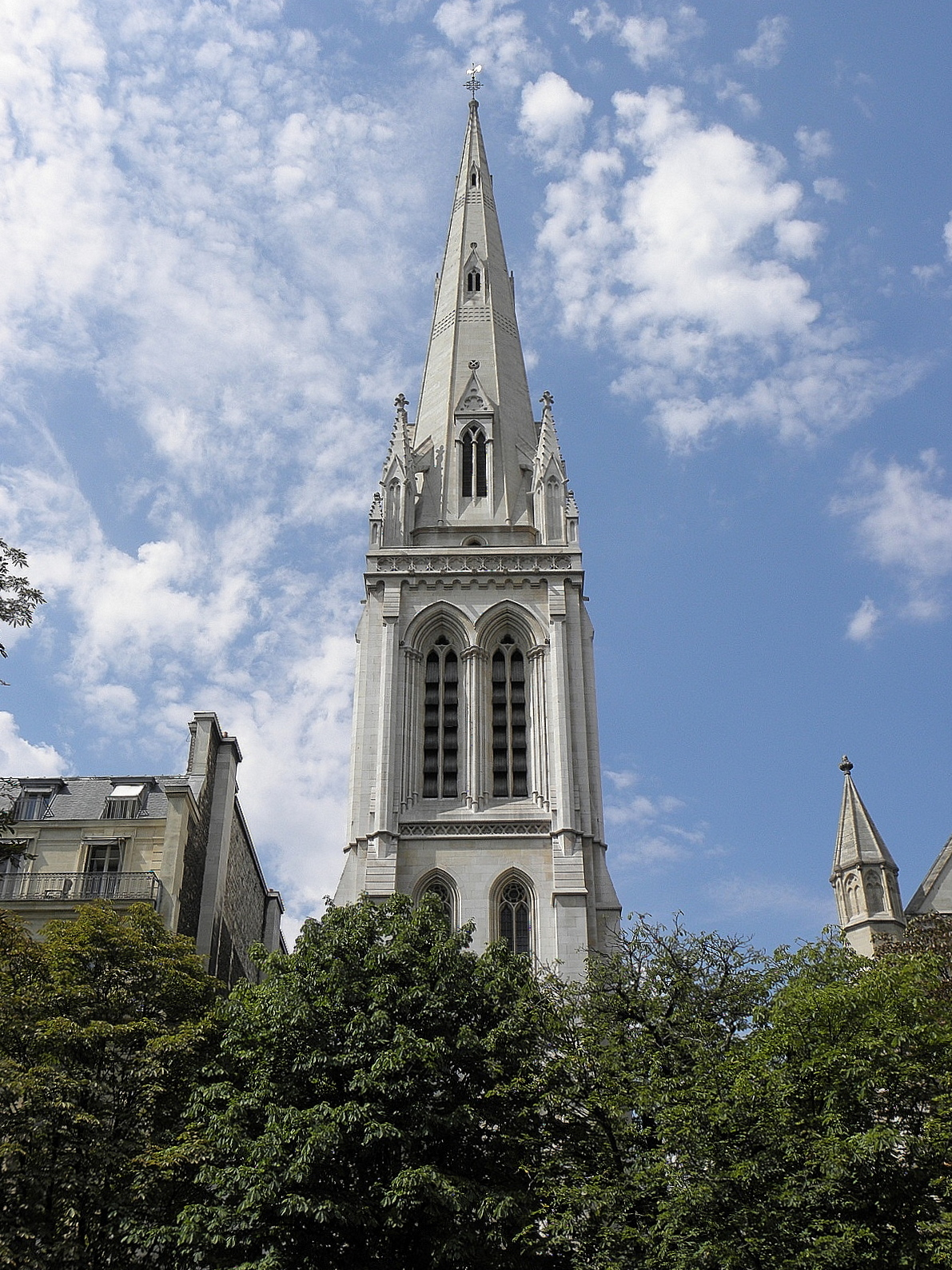
American Cathedral in Paris

- 8th arrondissement:
  - American Cathedral in Paris
  - St Michael's Church (Church of England)
- 16th arrondissement:
  - St George's Church (Church of England)

=== Antoinism ===
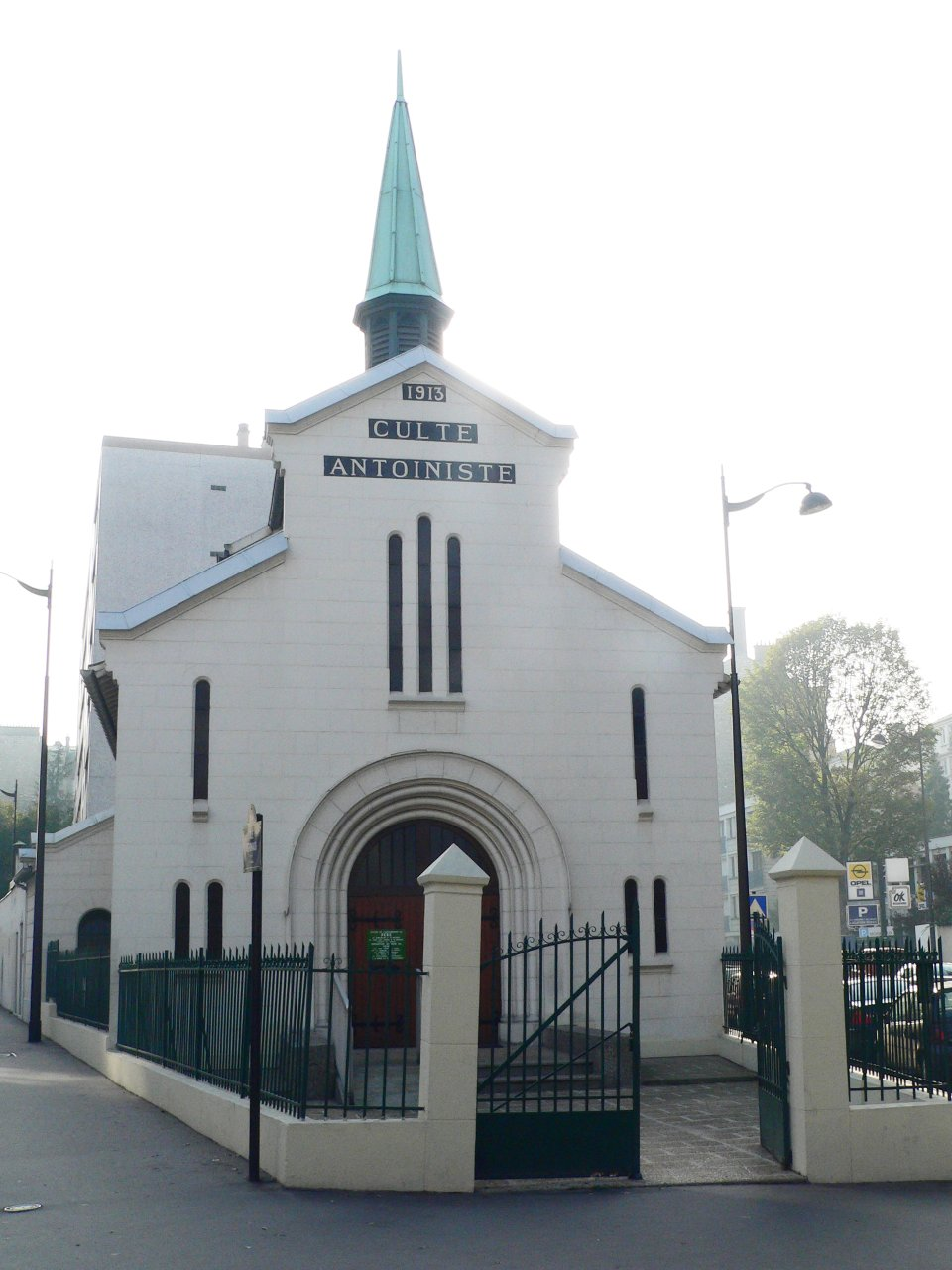
Temple antoiniste de Paris 13e

- 13th arrondissement:
  - Temple of 34, rue Vergniaud
- 17th arrondissement:
  - Temple of 10, passage Roux
- 19th arrondissement:
  - Temple of 49, rue du Pré-Saint-Gervais

=== Armenian Apostolic Church ===
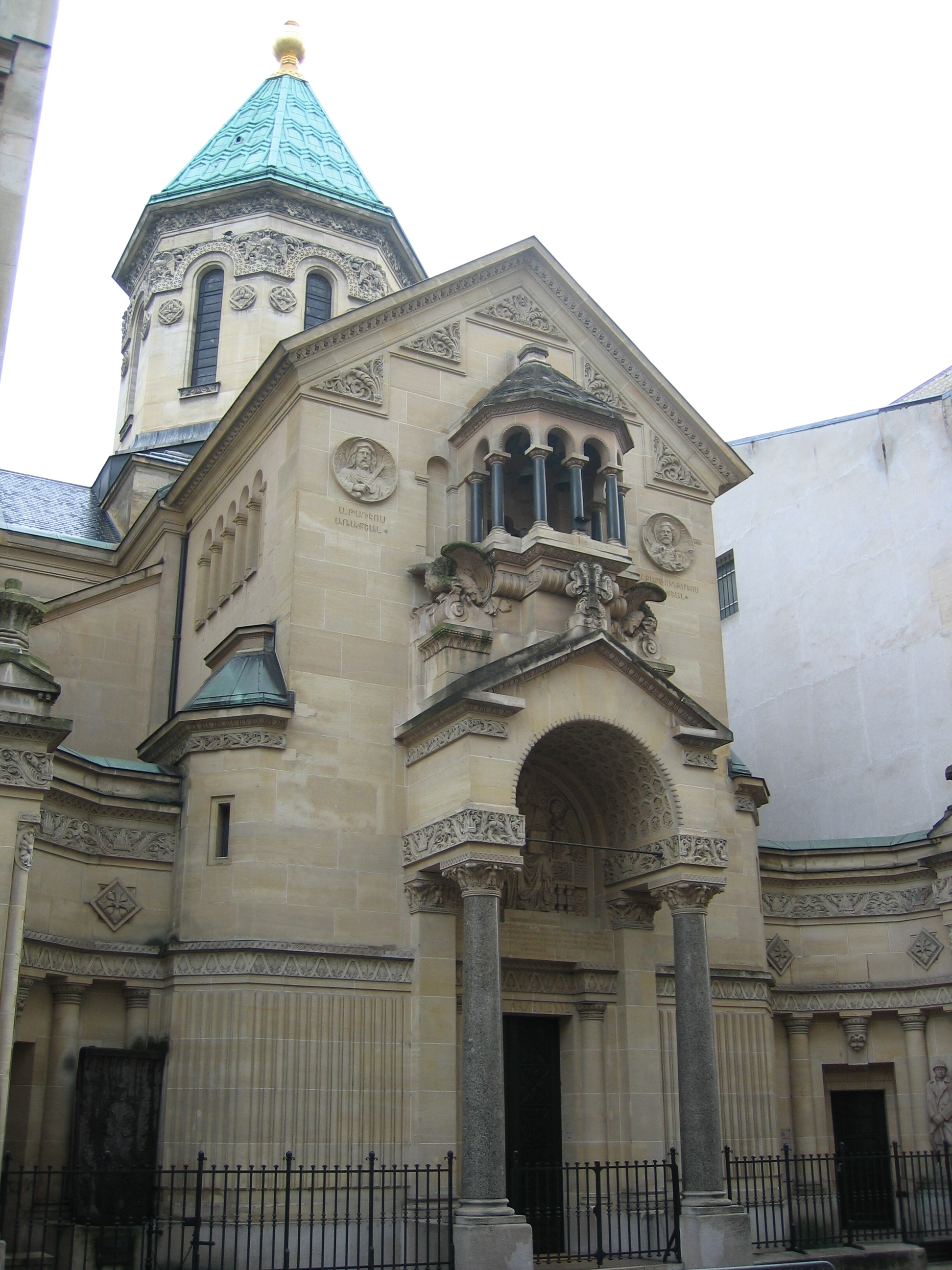
Cathédrale arménienne Saint-Jean-Baptiste de Paris

- 8th arrondissement:
  - Armenian Cathedral of St. John the Baptist

=== Armenian Catholic Church ===
- 3rd arrondissement:
  - Cathédrale arménienne catholique Sainte-Croix de Paris, 6 ter rue Charlot

=== Catholic Church ===
- 1st arrondissement:
  - Église Notre-Dame-de-l'Assomption
  - Église Saint-Eustache
  - Église Saint-Germain-l'Auxerrois
  - Église Saint-Leu-Saint-Gilles
  - Église Saint-Roch
  - Sainte-Chapelle

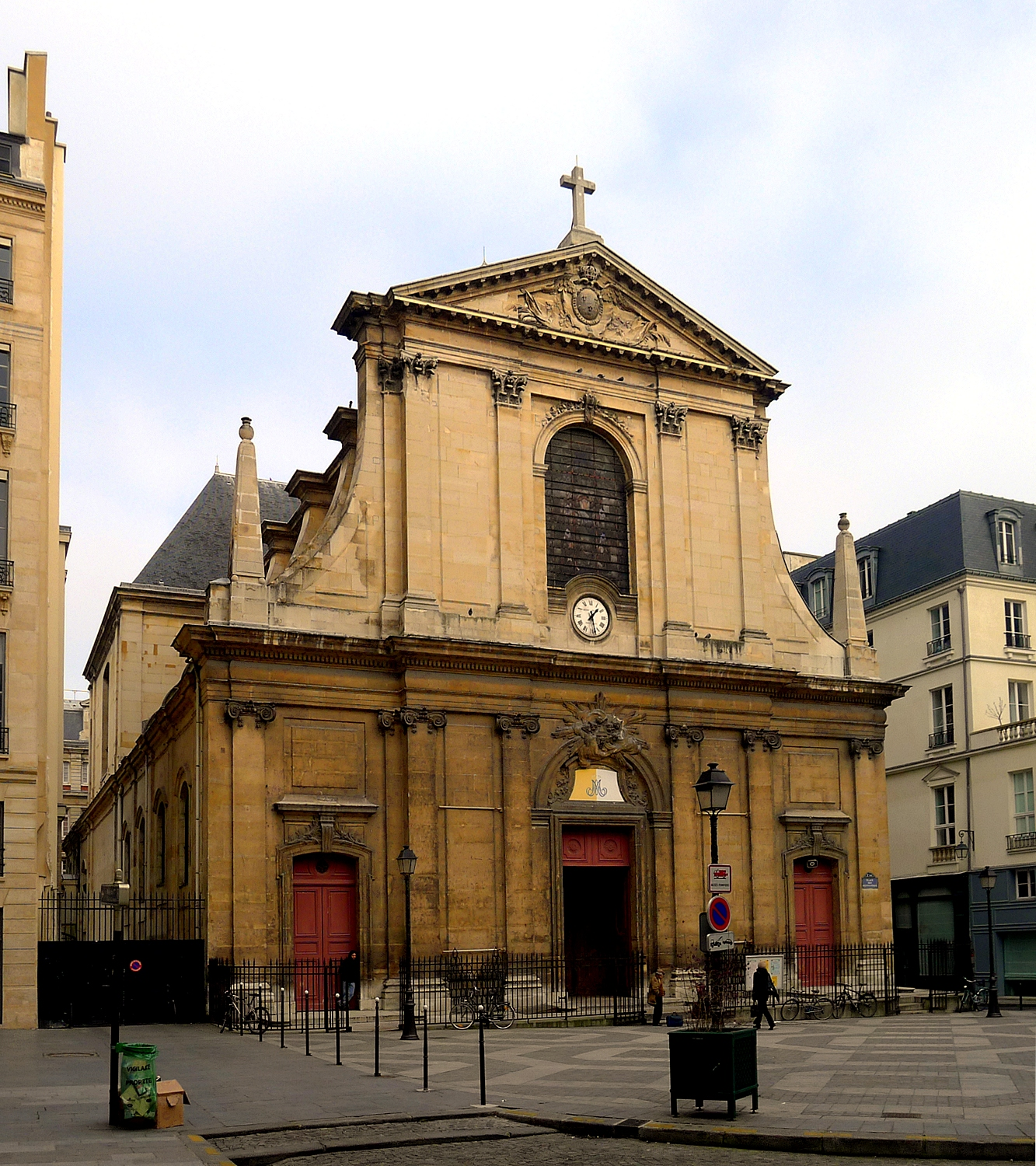
Basilique Notre-Dame-des-Victoires (2nd arr't)

- 2nd arrondissement:
  - Église Notre-Dame-de-Bonne-Nouvelle
  - Basilique Notre-Dame-des-Victoires
  - Église Saint-Sauveur (destroyed)
- 3rd arrondissement:
  - Saint-Denys-du-Saint-Sacrement
  - Saint Elizabeth of Hungary Church, Paris
  - Église Saint-Nicolas-des-Champs

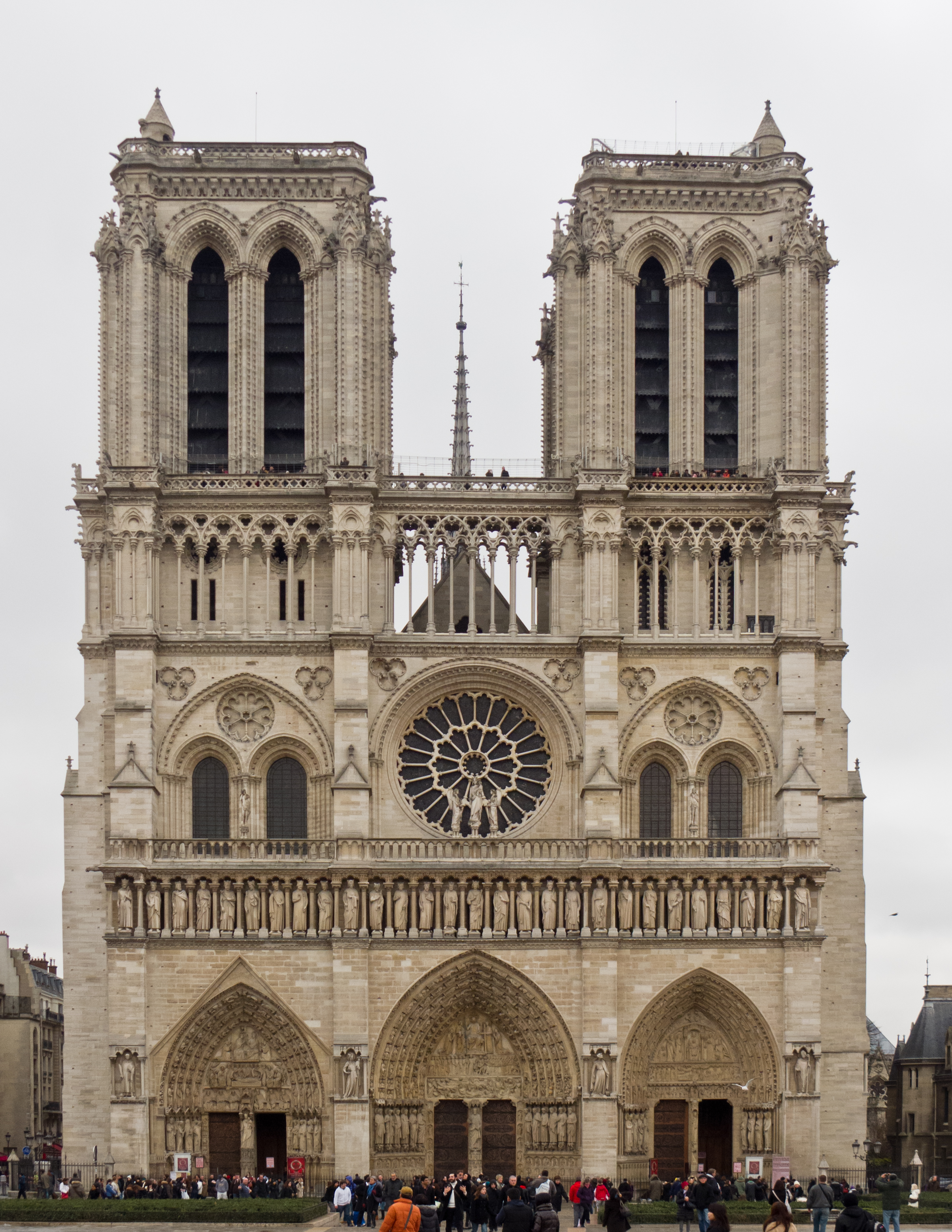
Notre-Dame, the cathedral of Paris, named after Our Lady (4th arr't)

- 4th arrondissement:
  - Cathédrale Notre-Dame de Paris
  - Église Notre-Dame-des-Blancs-Manteaux
  - Église Saint-Gervais-Saint-Protais
  - Église Saint-Louis-en-l'Île
  - Église Saint-Merri (Paris)
  - Église Saint-Paul-Saint-Louis

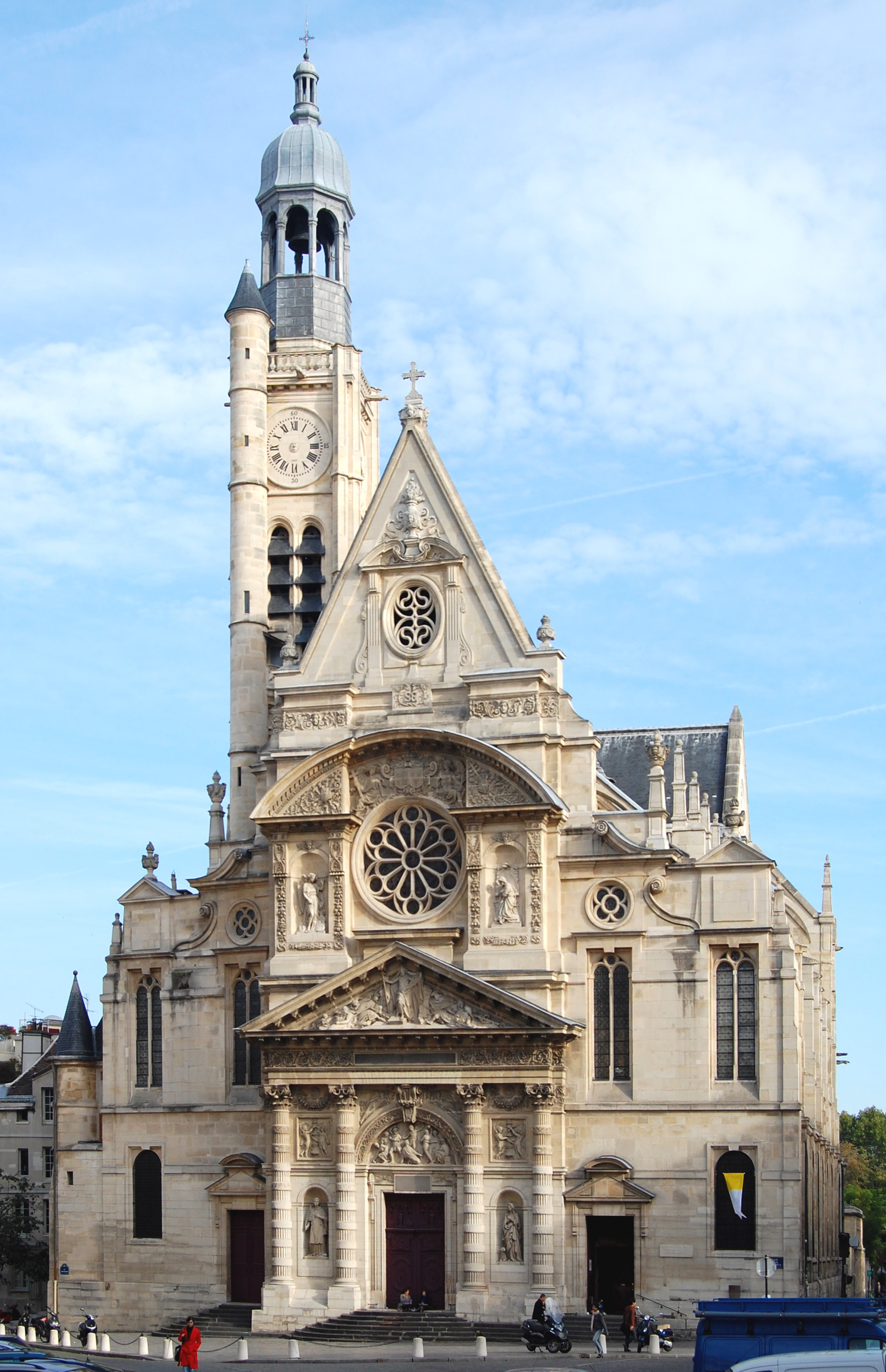
Église Saint-Étienne-du-Mont (5th arr't)

- 5th arrondissement:
  - Église Notre-Dame du Liban (Maronite Catholic Church)
  - Église Notre-Dame du Val-de-Grâce
  - Église Saint-Éphrem-le-Syriaque (Syriac Catholic Church)
  - Église Saint-Étienne-du-Mont
  - Église Saint-Jacques-du-Haut-Pas
  - Église Saint-Julien-le-Pauvre (Melkite Greek Catholic Church)
  - Saint-Medard, Paris
  - Église Saint-Nicolas-du-Chardonnet (occupied by SSPX)
  - Église Saint-Séverin

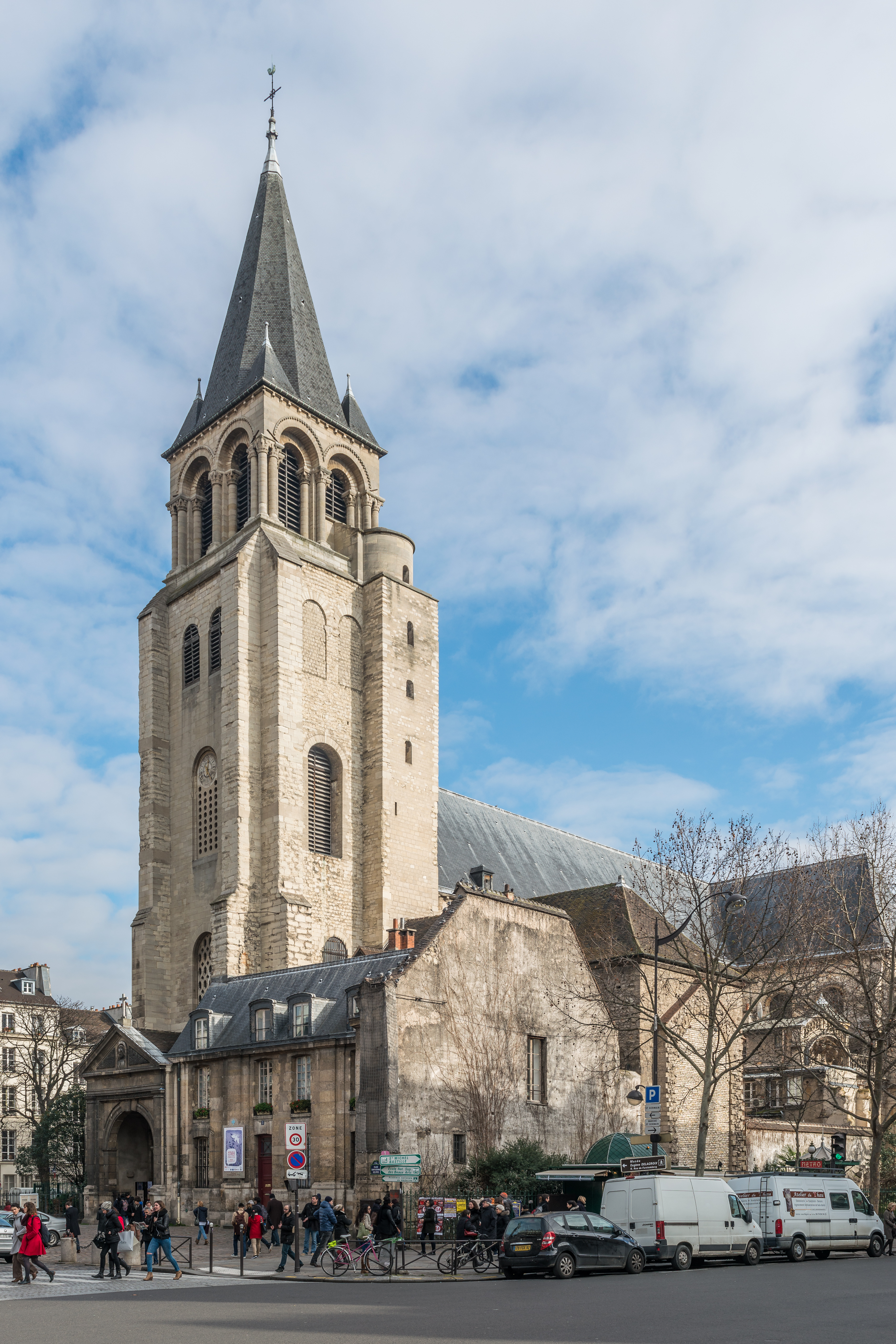
Église de Saint-Germain-des-Prés (6th arr't)

- 6th arrondissement:
  - Notre-Dame-des-Champs, Paris
  - Église de Saint-Germain-des-Prés
  - Church of Saint-Ignace, Paris
  - Église Saint-Joseph-des-Carmes
  - Église Saint-Sulpice
  - Saint Vincent de Paul Chapel

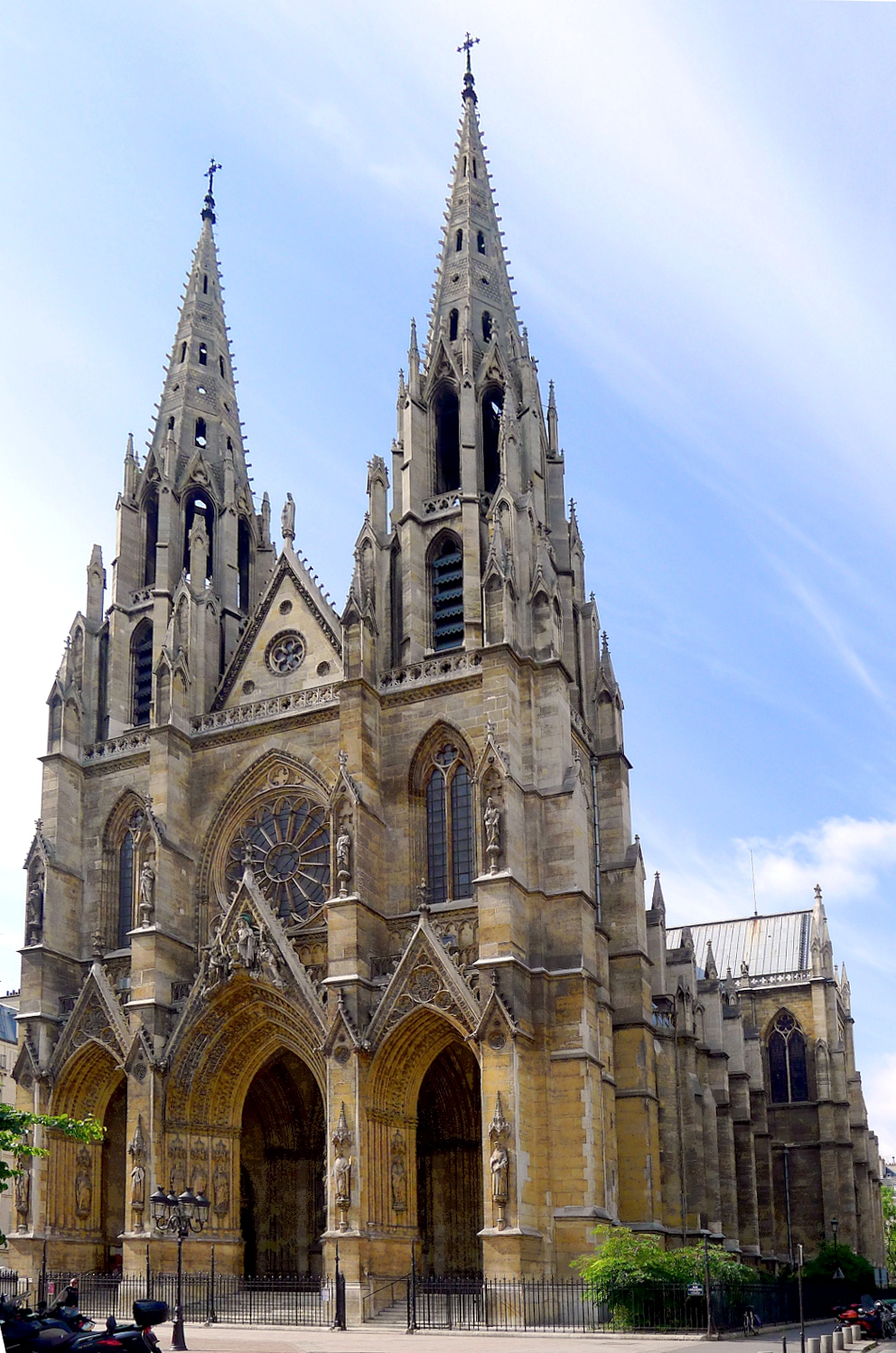
Basilica of Saint Clotilde (7th arr't)

- 7th arrondissement:
  - Chapelle Notre-Dame-du-Bon-Conseil (linked to Église Saint-François-Xavier (Paris))
  - Chapelle Notre-Dame-de-la-médaille-miraculeuse
  - Basilique Sainte-Clotilde
  - Église Saint-François-Xavier
  - Église Saint-Louis des Invalides
  - Saint-Pierre-du-Gros-Caillou
  - Église Saint-Thomas-d'Aquin

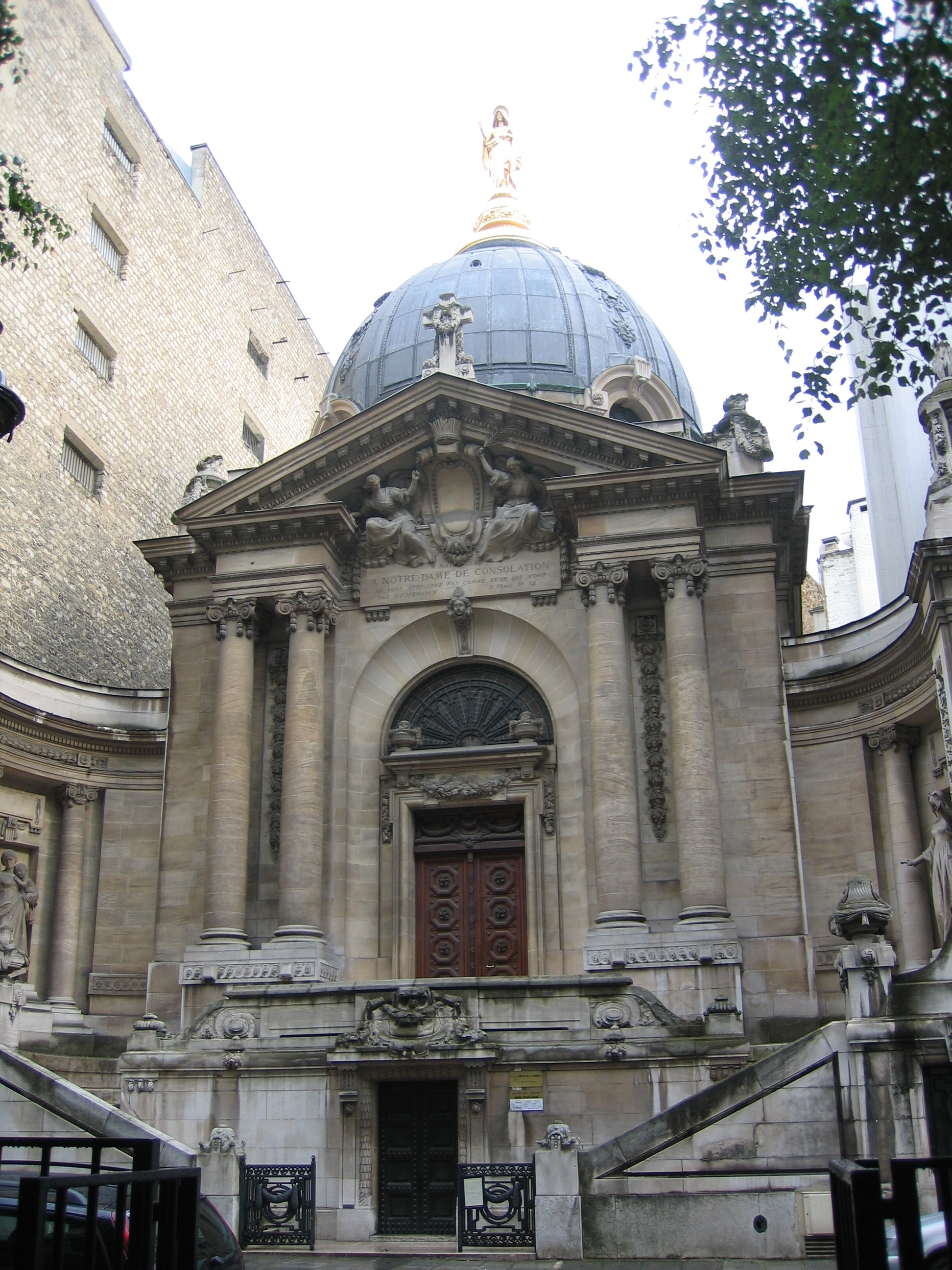
Chapelle Notre-Dame de Consolation (8th arr't)

- 8th arrondissement:
  - Église de la Madeleine
  - Église Saint-André-de-l'Europe (Paris)
  - Église Saint-Augustin
  - Église Saint-Joseph (Anglophone mission)
  - Église Saint-Philippe-du-Roule
  - Chapel of Notre-Dame-de-La-Consolation, Paris
- 9th arrondissement:
  - Église Notre-Dame-de-Lorette
  - Église Saint-Eugène-Sainte-Cécile
  - Saint-Louis-d'Antin
  - Chapelle Sainte-Rita (linked to the parish of the Église de la Sainte-Trinité)
  - Église de la Sainte-Trinité

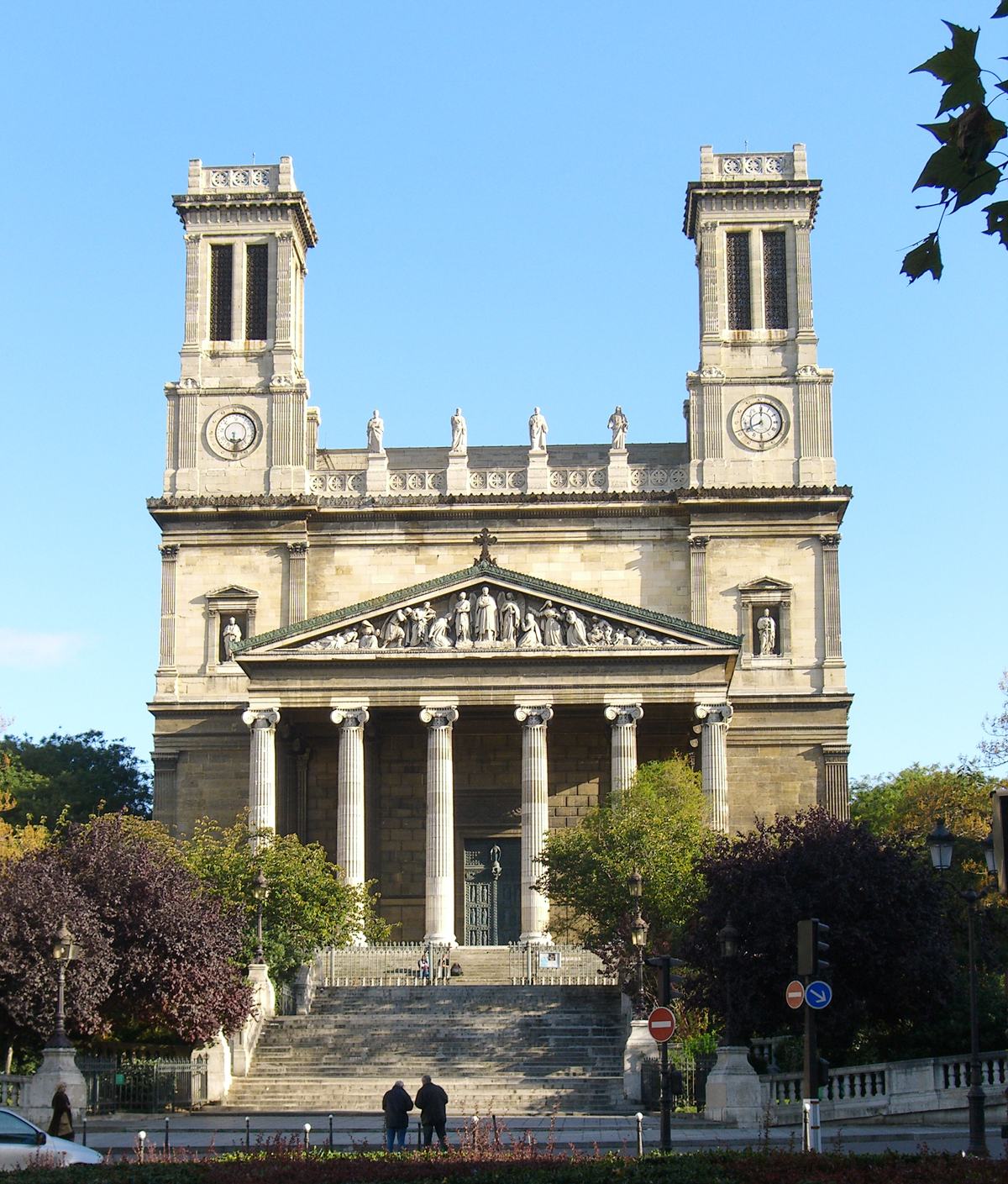
Church of Saint-Vincent-de-Paul (10th arr't)

- 10th arrondissement:
  - Saint-Martin-des-Champs, Paris
  - Saint-Joseph-Artisan, Paris
  - Église Saint-Laurent
  - Église Saint-Vincent-de-Paul
- 11th arrondissement:
  - Sainte-Marguerite, Paris
  - Église du Bon-Pasteur (Paris)
  - Église Notre-Dame-d'Espérance
  - Basilique Notre-Dame-du-Perpétuel-Secours
  - Église Saint-Ambroise
  - Saint-Joseph-des-Nations

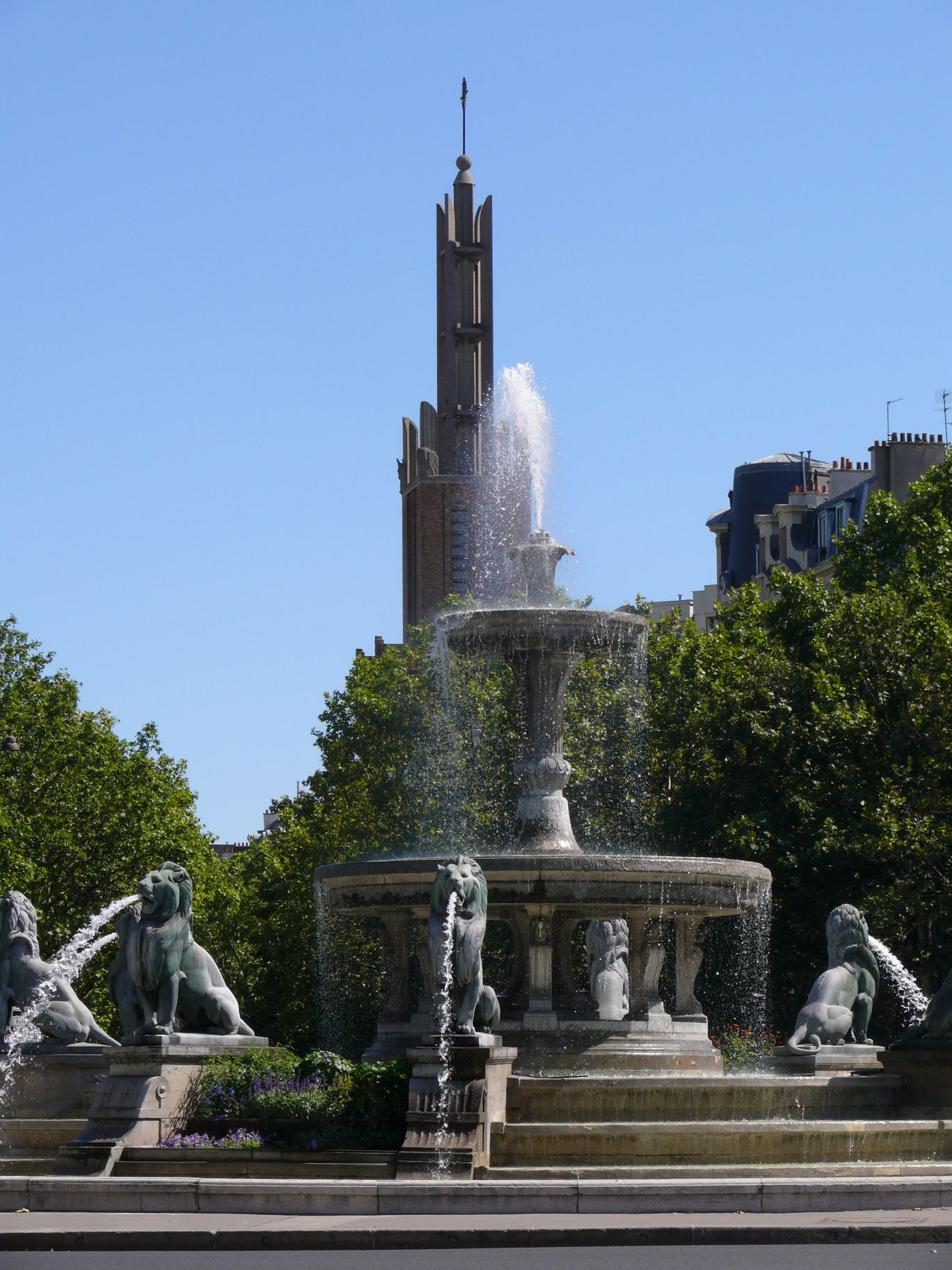
Église Saint-Esprit (12th arr't)

- 12th arrondissement:
  - Église de l'Immaculée-Conception (Paris)
  - Église Notre-Dame-de-la-Nativité de Bercy
  - Chapelle Notre-Dame-de-la-Paix de Picpus
  - Église Saint-Antoine-des-Quinze-Vingts
  - Église Saint-Éloi (Paris)
  - Église Saint-Esprit
- 13th arrondissement:
  - Saint-Hippolyte, Paris
  - Église Notre-Dame de Chine (Paris)
  - Chapelle Notre-Dame-de-la-Sagesse
  - Église Notre-Dame de la Gare
  - Église Saint-Albert-le-Grand
  - Église Saint-Hippolyte (Paris)
  - Église Saint-Jean-des-Deux-Moulins
  - Église Saint-Marcel (Paris)
  - Église Sainte-Rosalie
  - Sainte-Anne de la Butte-aux-Cailles

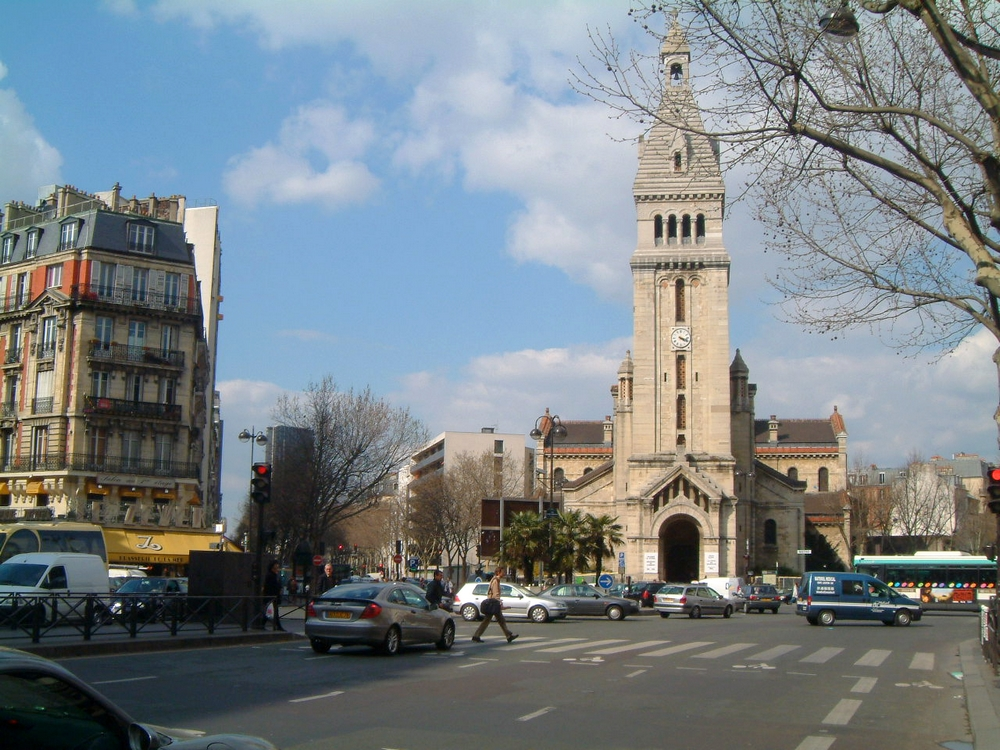
Église Saint-Pierre-de-Montrouge (14th arr't)

- 14th arrondissement:
  - Notre-dame-du-Rosaire, Paris
  - Notre-Dame-du-Travail, Paris
  - Saint-Dominique Church (Paris)
  - Chapel of the Convent of Saint Francis, Paris
  - Couvent Saint-François de Paris
  - Chapelle Saint-Joseph-de-Cluny
  - Église Saint-Pierre-de-Montrouge

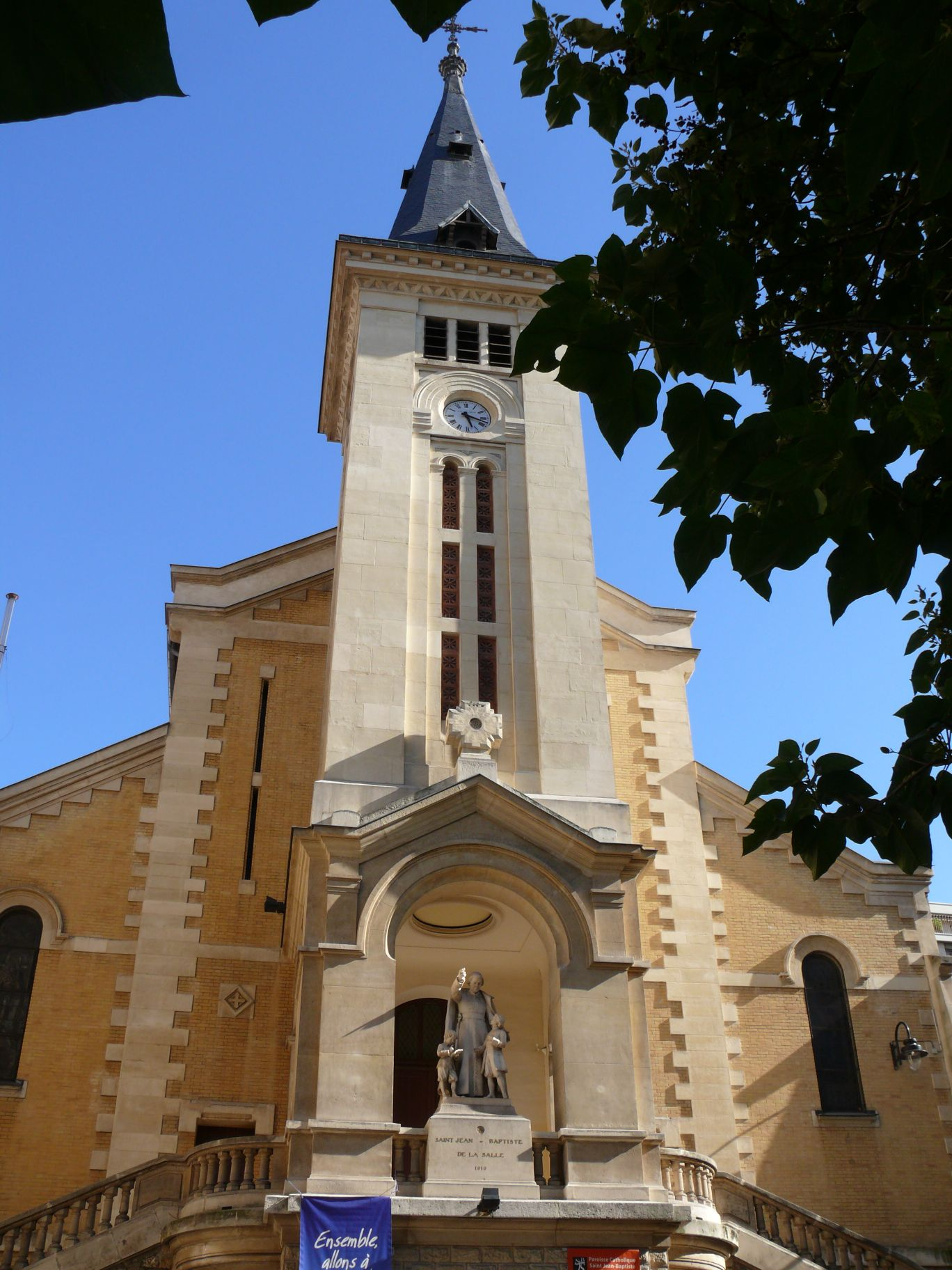
Église Saint-Jean-Baptiste-de-la-Salle (15th arr't)

- 15th arrondissement:
- ̈ Notre-Dame-de-l'Arche-d'Alliance
  - Église Notre-Dame-de-Nazareth (Paris)
  - Église Notre-Dame-de-la-Salette
  - Église Saint-Antoine-de-Padoue (Paris)
  - Chapelle Saint-Bernard-de-Montparnasse
  - Saint-Christophe-de-Javel, Paris
  - Saint-Jean-Baptiste de Grenelle, Paris
  - Église Saint-Jean-Baptiste de Grenelle
  - Église Saint-Jean-Baptiste-de-La-Salle
  - Saint-Lambert Church of Vaugirard
  - Saint-Leon Church, Paris

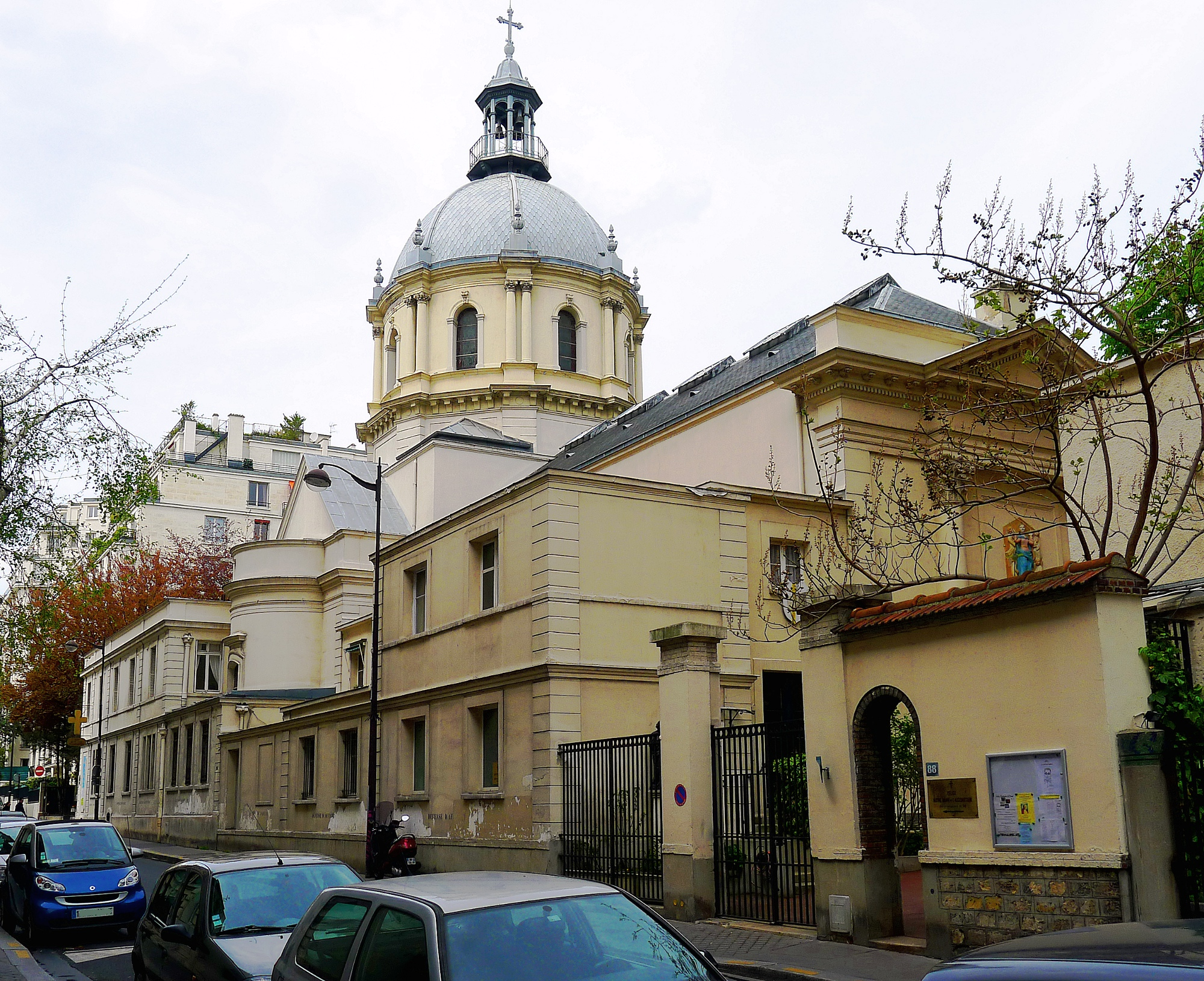
Notre-Dame de l'Assomption de Passy (16th arr't)

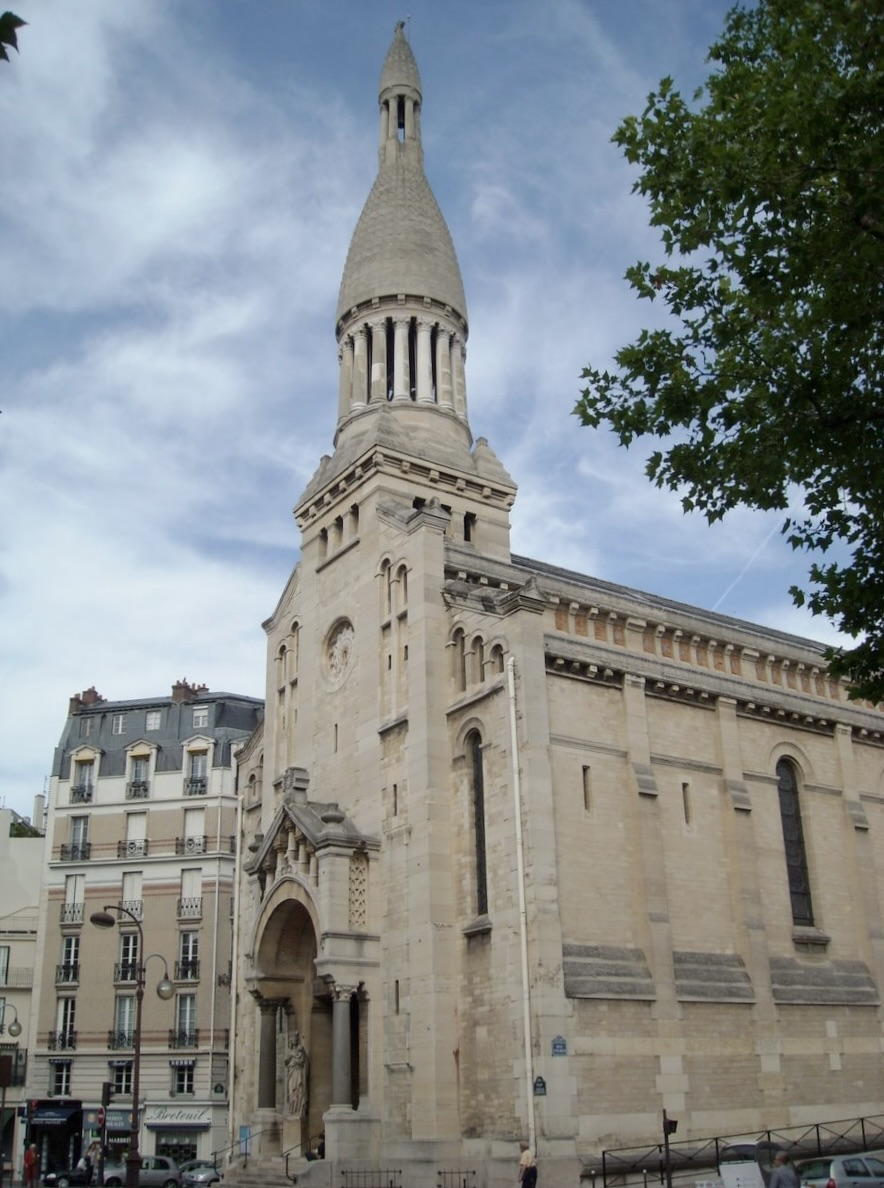
Église Notre-Dame-d'Auteuil (16th arr't)

- 16th arrondissement:
  - Église Saint-Albert-le-Grand (German mission)
  - Église Notre-Dame-de-l'Assomption de Passy
  - Église Notre-Dame-d'Auteuil
  - Notre-Dame-de-Grace de Passy
  - Chapelle Notre-Dame du Saint Sacrement (Paris)
  - Église Saint-François-de-Molitor
  - Église Saint-Honoré-d'Eylau
  - Église Saint-Pierre-de-Chaillot
  - Église Sainte-Jeanne-de-Chantal
  - Église catholique russe de la Sainte Trinité (Byzantine Catholic)

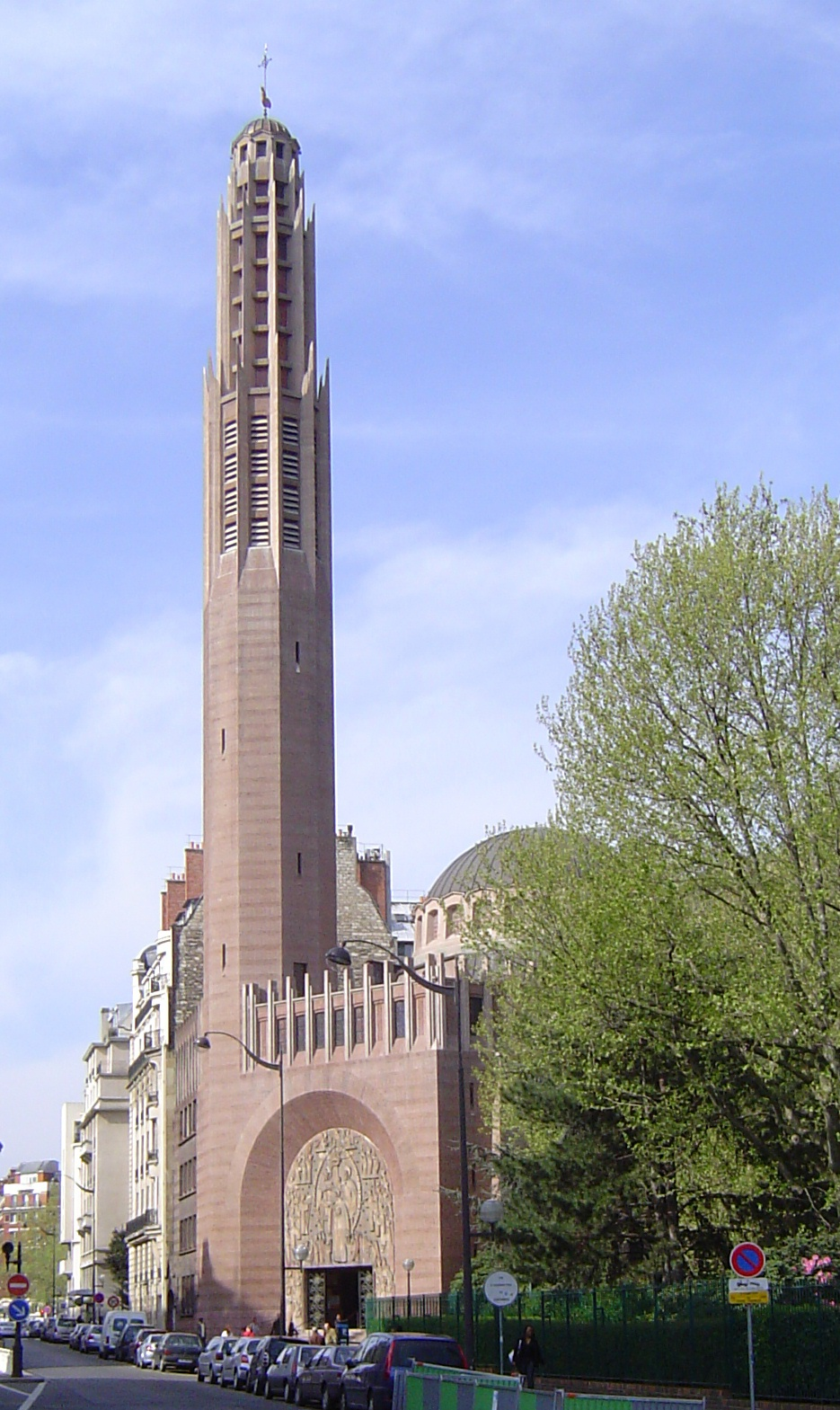
Sainte-Odile, Paris (I7th arr't)

- 17th arrondissement:
  - Church of Saint-Ferdinand des Ternes, Paris
  - Notre-Dame-de-la-Compassion, Paris
  - Église Sainte-Marie des Batignolles
  - Église Saint-Charles-de-Monceau
  - Église Saint-Ferdinand-des-Ternes
  - Église Saint-François-de-Sales (Paris)
  - Église Saint-Joseph-des-Épinettes
  - Église Saint-Michel des Batignolles
  - Eglise Sainte-Odile

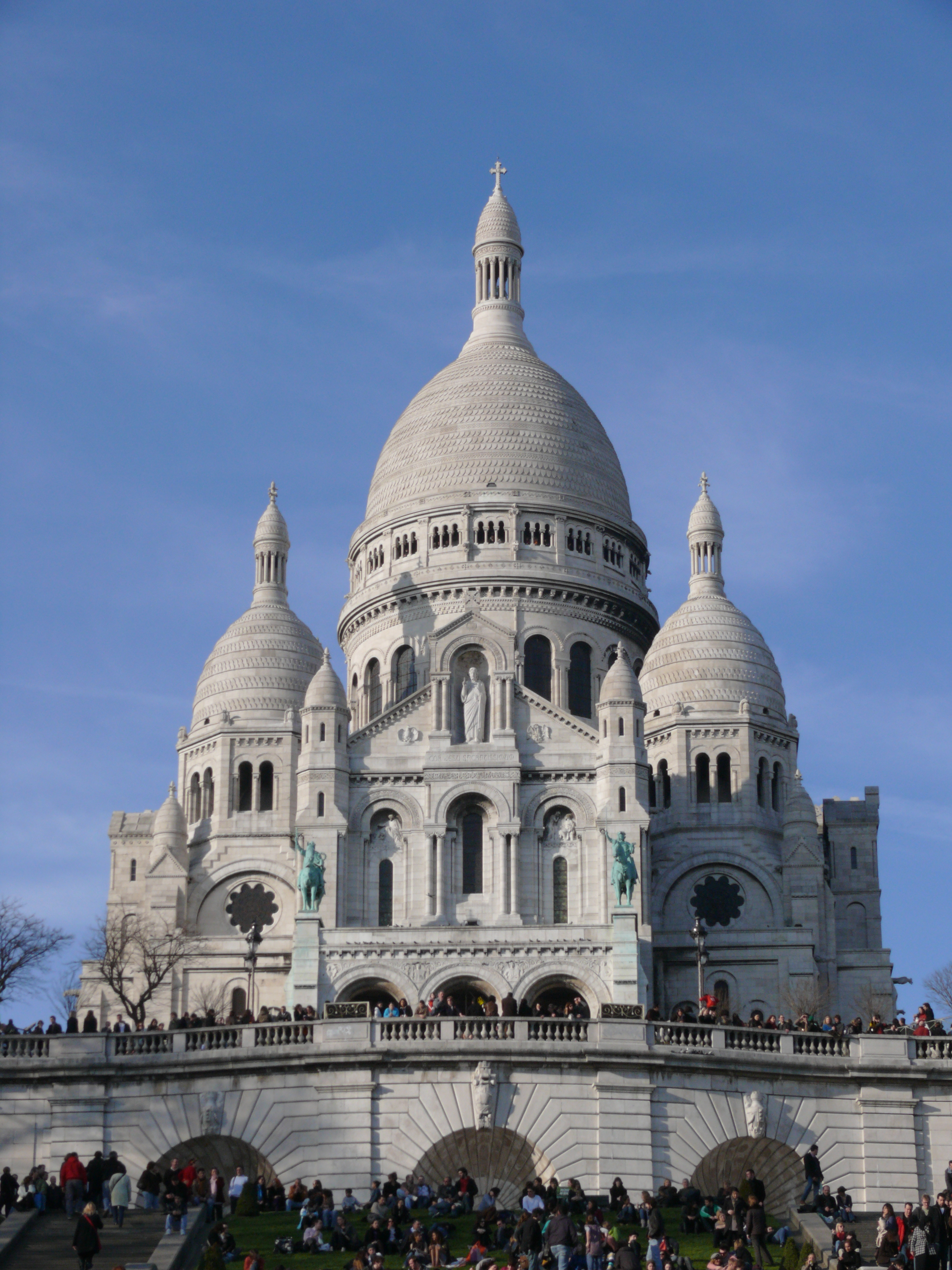
The Sacré-Cœur Basilica (18th arr't)

- 18th arrondissement:
  - Basilique du Sacré-Cœur de Montmartre
  - Basilique Sainte-Jeanne-d'Arc
  - Église Notre-Dame-du-Bon-Conseil (Paris)
  - Église Notre-Dame de Clignancourt
  - Église Saint-Bernard de la Chapelle
  - Église Saint-Denys de la Chapelle
  - Église Saint-Jean-de-Montmartre
  - Église Saint-Pierre de Montmartre
  - Église Sainte-Geneviève des Grandes-Carrières
  - Église Sainte-Hélène (Paris)

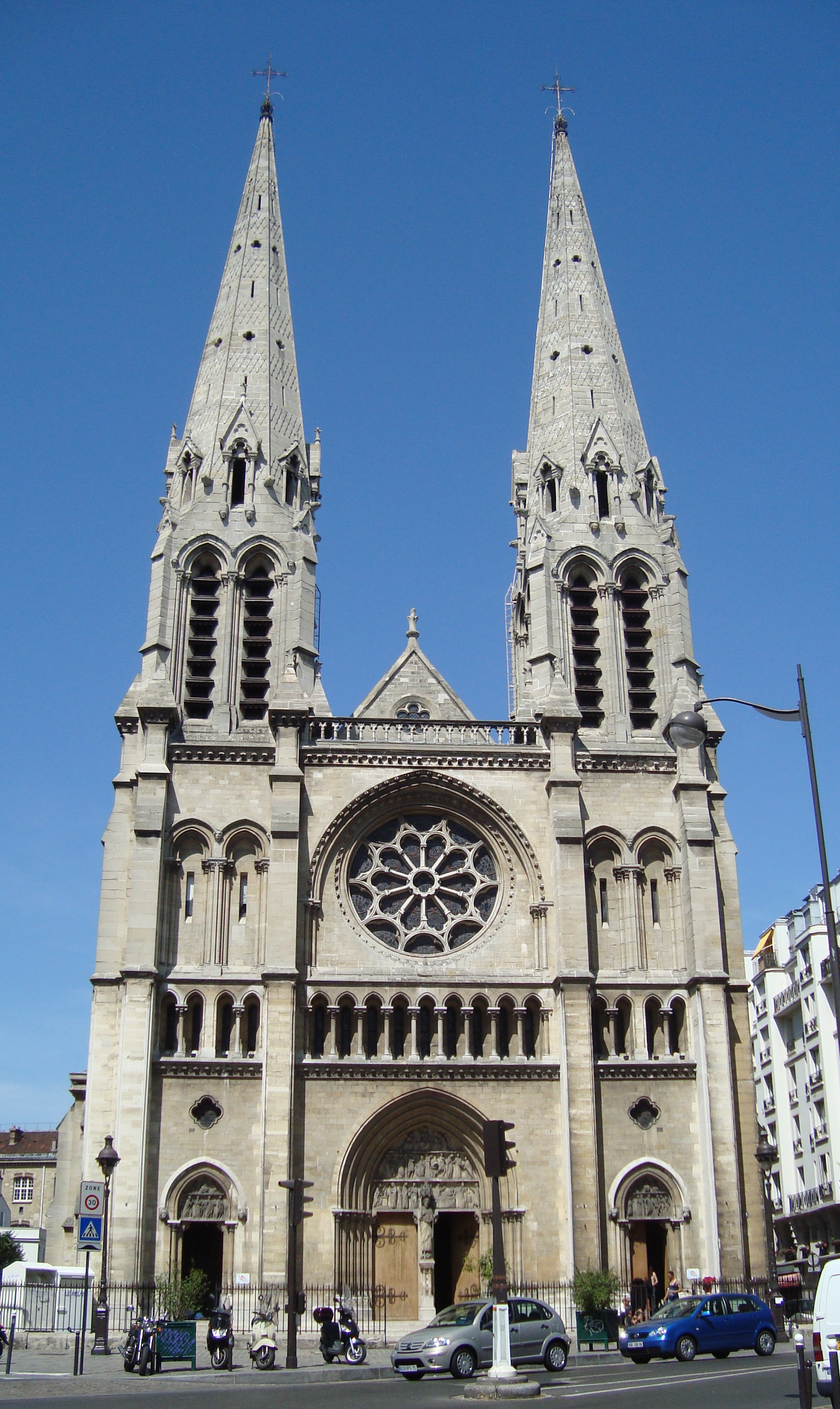
Église Saint-Jean-Baptiste de Belleville (19th arr't)

- 19th arrondissement:
  - Saint Francis of Assisi Church, Paris
  - Saint-Jean-Baptiste de Belleville
  - Saint-Jacques-Saint-Christophe de la Villette
  - Notre-Dame-de-Fatima-Marie-Mediatrice
  - Église de Marie-Médiatrice-de-Toutes-les-Grâces ou Sanctuaire Notre-Dame-de-Fatima
  - Église Notre-Dame-de-l'Assomption des Buttes-Chaumont
  - Église Notre-Dame-des-Foyers
  - Église Sainte-Claire (Paris)
  - Église Sainte-Colette des Buttes-Chaumont
  - Saint Francis of Assisi church, Paris)
  - Église Saint-Georges de la Villette
  - Église Saint-Jacques-Saint-Christophe de la Villette
  - Église Saint-Luc (Paris)

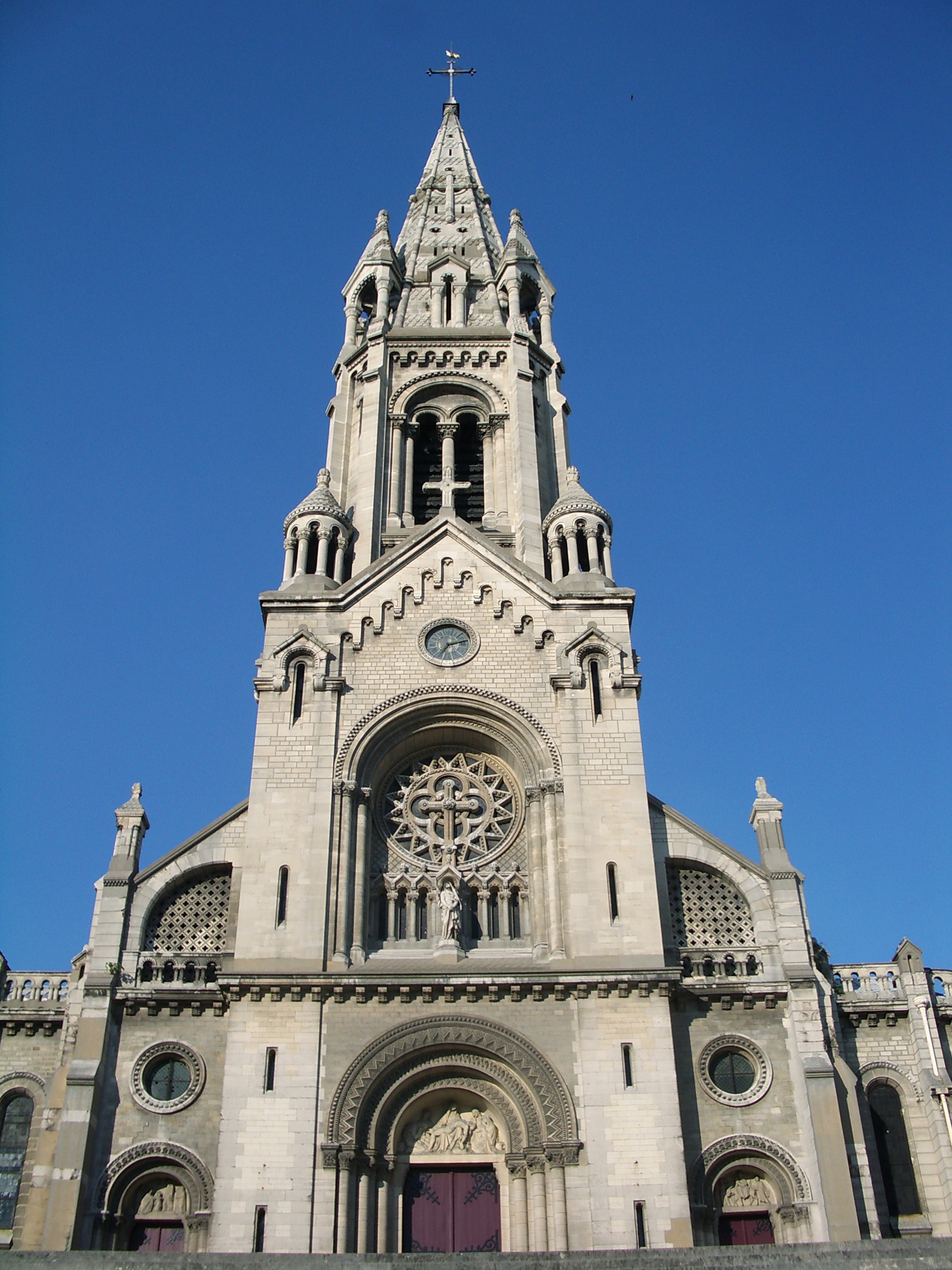
Église Notre-Dame-de-la-Croix de Ménilmontant (20th arr't)

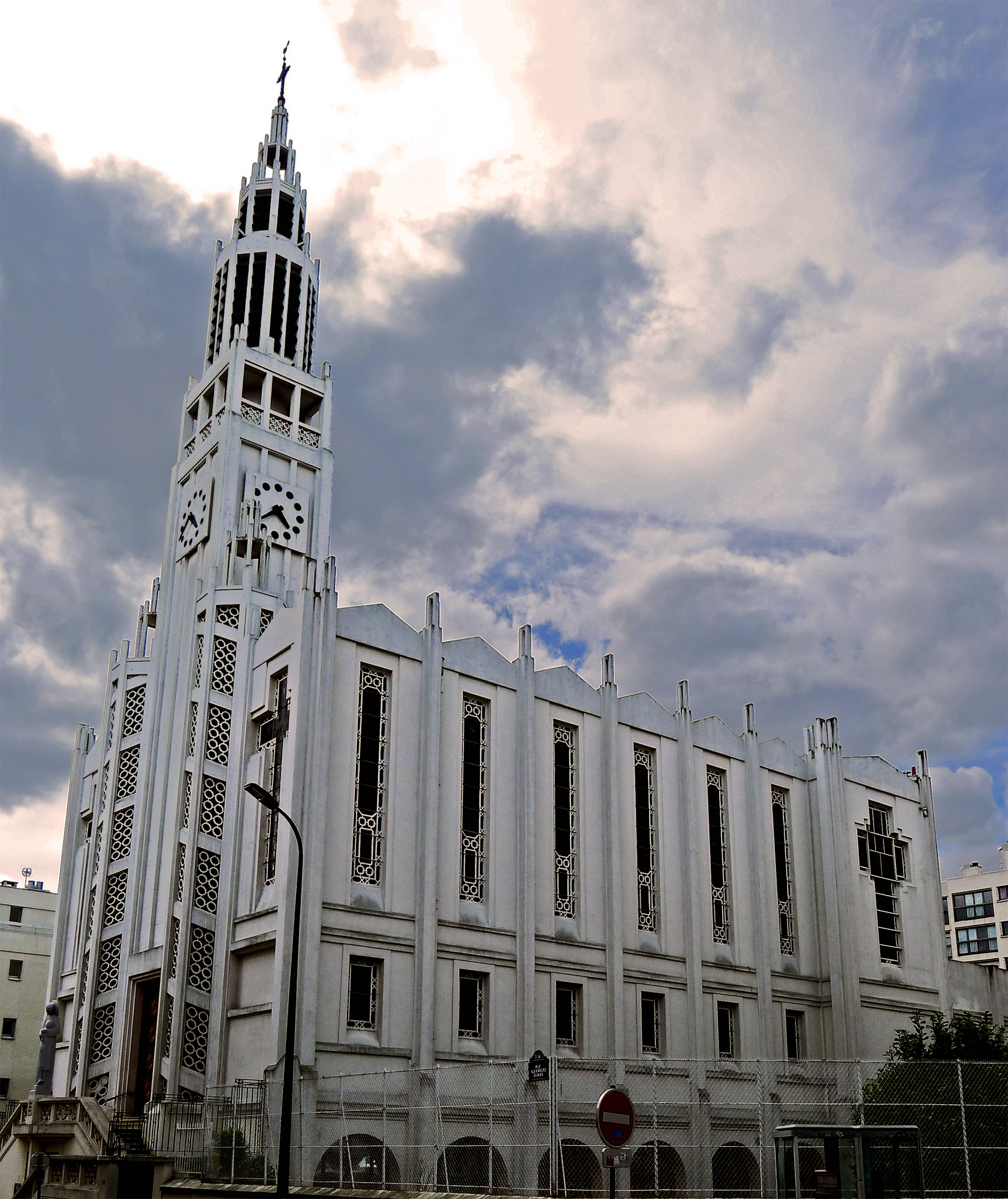
Église Saint-Jean-Bosco (20th arr't)

- 20th arrondissement:
  - Église du Cœur-Eucharistique-de-Jésus
  - Saint-Germain de Charonne, Paris
  - Église Notre-Dame-de-la-Croix de Ménilmontant
  - Église Notre-Dame-de-Lourdes (Paris)
  - Chapelle Saint-Charles de la Croix-Saint-Simon
  - Église Saint-Cyril Saint-Méthode (Paris)
  - Église Saint-Gabriel (Paris)
  - Church of Saint-Jean-Bosco, Paris
  - Notre-Dame-des-Otages, Paris

=== Christian Science ===
- 8th arrondissement:
  - Reading room, 38 rue Turin
- 16th arrondissement:
  - Second Church of Christ Scientist, 58 bd Flandrin

=== The Church of Jesus Christ of Latter-day Saints ===
- 4th arrondissement:
  - Church of 12 rue St Merri
- 19th arrondissement:
  - Church of 66 rue Romainville

=== Eastern Orthodox Church ===
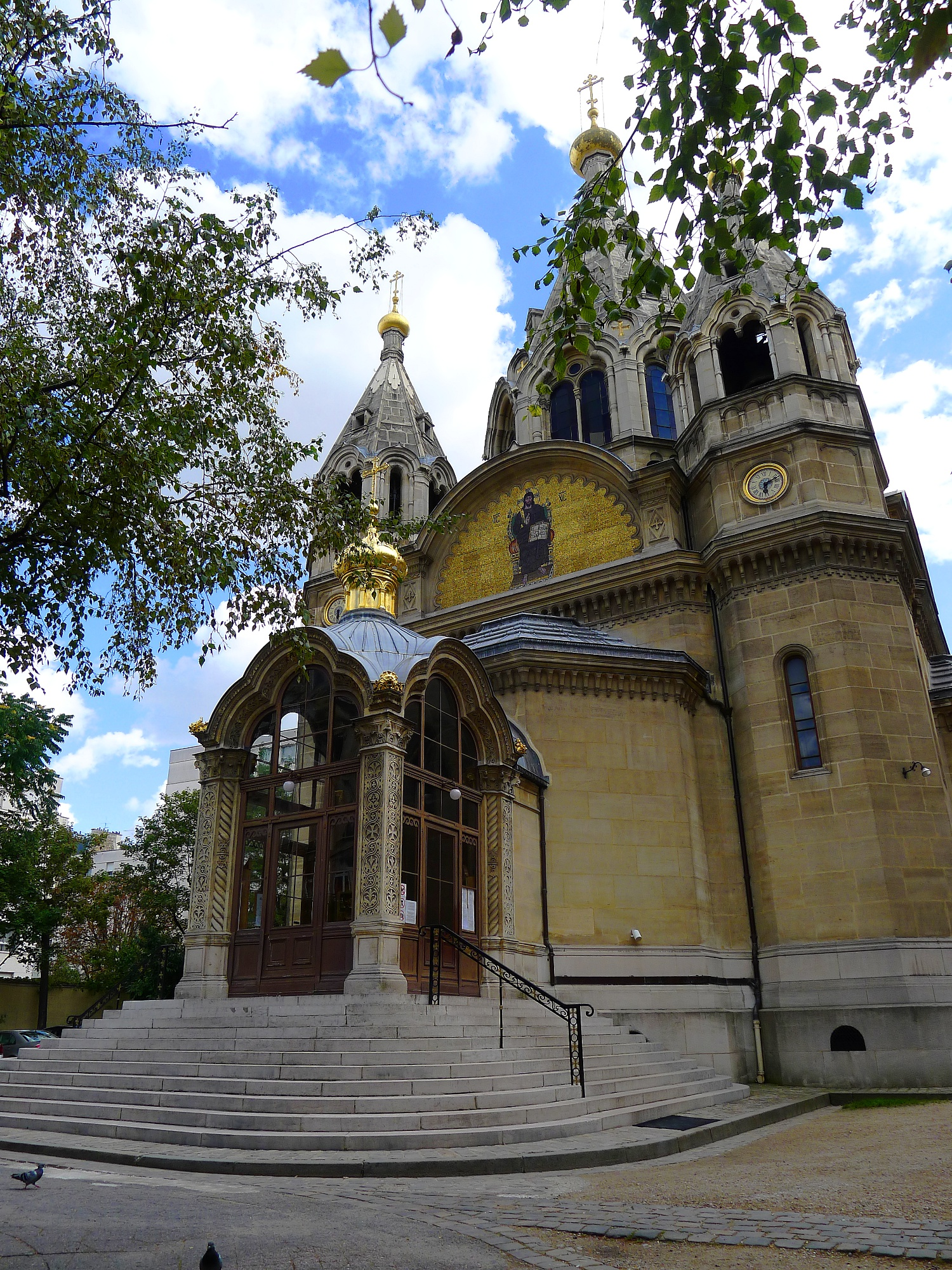
Alexander Nevsky Cathedral (8th arr't)

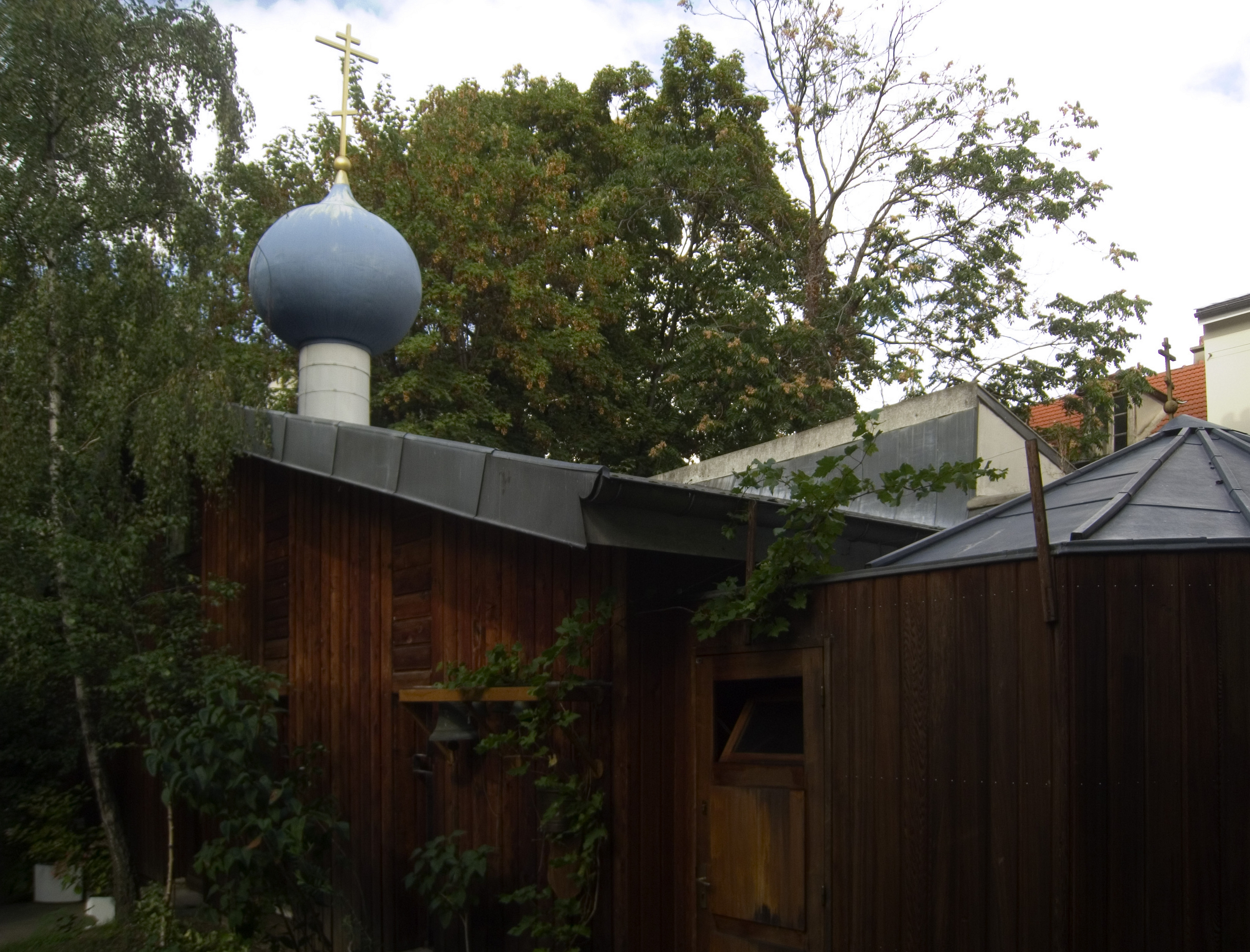
Église Saint-Séraphin-de-Sarov (15th arr't)

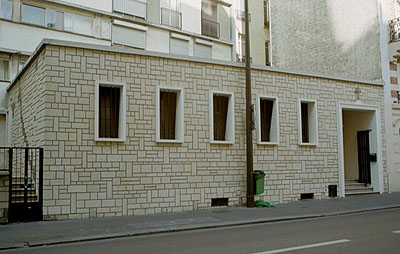
Église exarcale des Trois-Saints-Hiérarques (15th arr't)

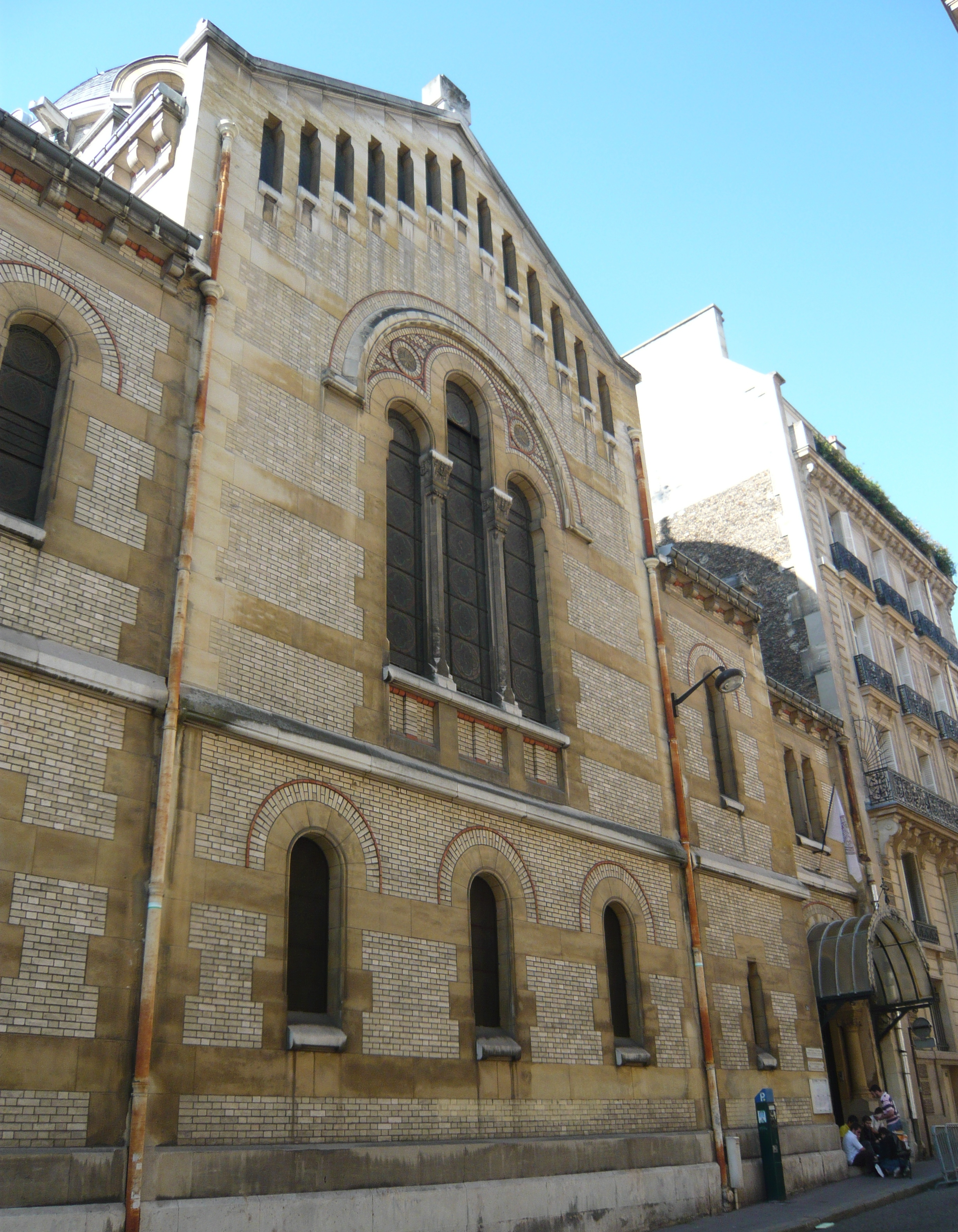
Cathédrale Grecque Saint-Étienne (16th arr't)

- 5th arrondissement:
  - Paroisse Notre Dame Joie des Affligés et Sainte Geneviève
  - Église des Saints-Archanges
- 6th arrondissement:
  - Paroisse Sainte-Parascève et Sainte-Geneviève
- 8th arrondissement:
  - Cathédrale Saint-Alexandre-Nevski
- 9th arrondissement:
  - Église des Saints-Constantin-et-Hélène
- 11th arrondissement:
  - Église Sainte-Marguerite
- 13th arrondissement:
  - Église Saint-Irénée
- 15th arrondissement:
  - Église de la Présentation-de-la-Vierge-au-Temple
  - Église Saint-Séraphin-de-Sarov
  - Église exarcale des Trois-Saints-Hiérarques
  - Église de l'Apparition-de-la-Vierge
- 16th arrondissement:
  - St. Stephen's Greek Orthodox Cathedral
  - Église de Tous-les-Saints-de-la-Terre-Russe
  - Paroisse de l'Apparition de la Vierge
- 18th arrondissement:
  - Église Serbe Saint-Sava
- 19th arrondissement:
  - Église Saint-Serge

=== Evangelical Lutheran Church ===
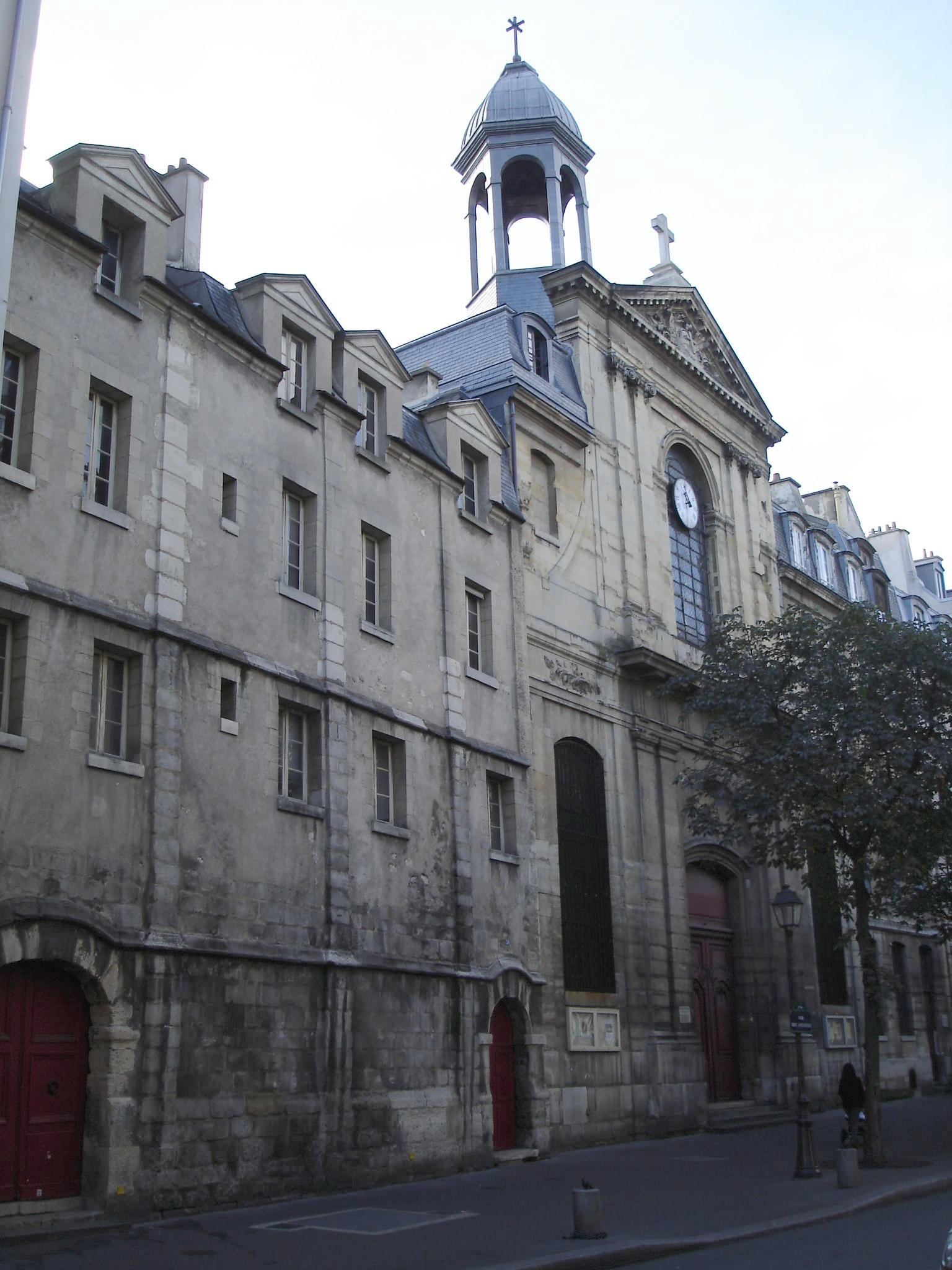
Église des Billettes (4th arr't)

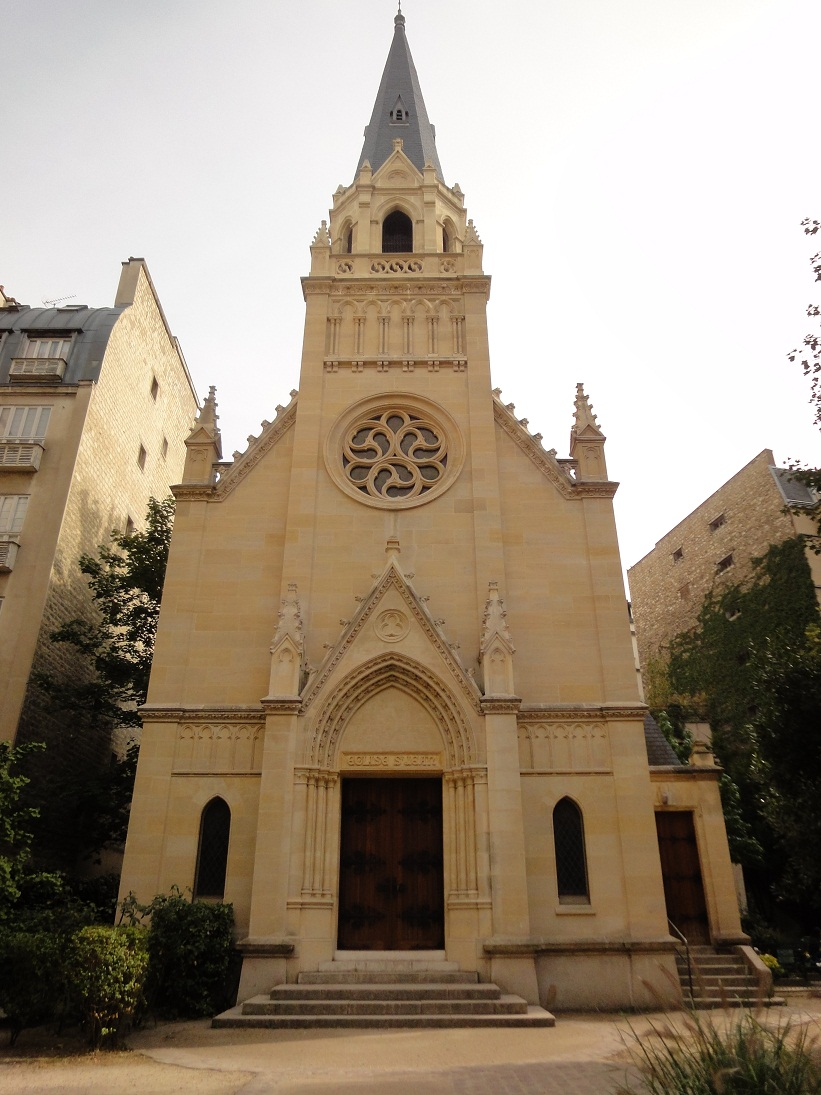
Église Saint-Jean (7th arr't)

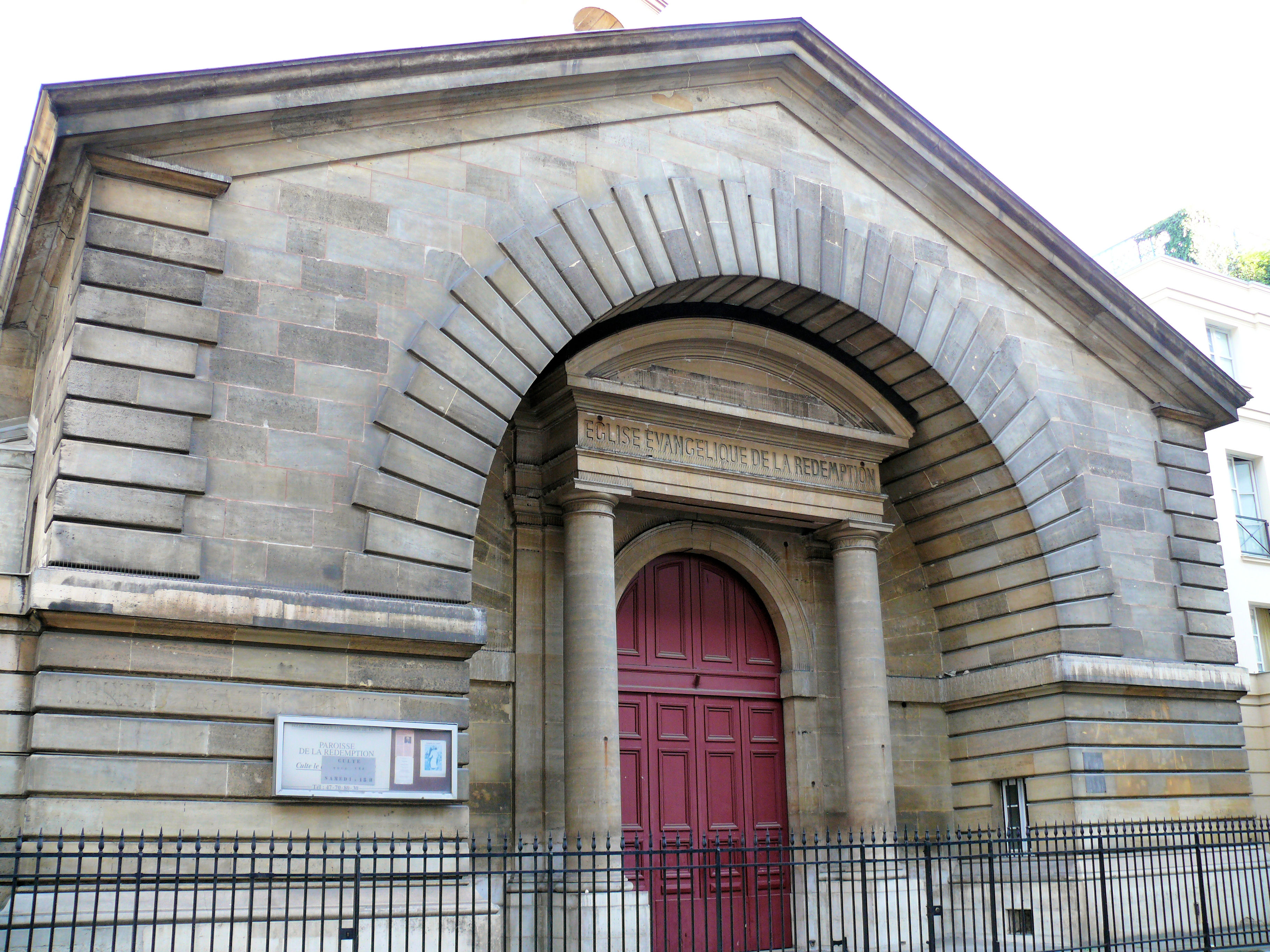
Temple de la Rédemption (9th arr't)

- 4th arrondissement:
  - Église des Billettes
- 5th arrondissement:
  - Église Saint-Marcel
- 7th arrondissement:
  - Église de Saint-Jean
- 9th arrondissement:
  - Temple de la Rédemption
- 11th arrondissement:
  - Église du Bon-Secours
- 15th arrondissement:
  - Église de la Résurrection
  - Église Saint-Sauveur
- 17th arrondissement:
  - Église de l'Ascension
  - Église suédoise de Paris
- 18th arrondissement:
  - Église Saint-Paul
- 19th arrondissement:
  - Église Saint-Pierre

=== New Apostolic Church ===
- 11th arrondissement:
  - Church of 60 rue Trousseau

=== Reformed churches ===
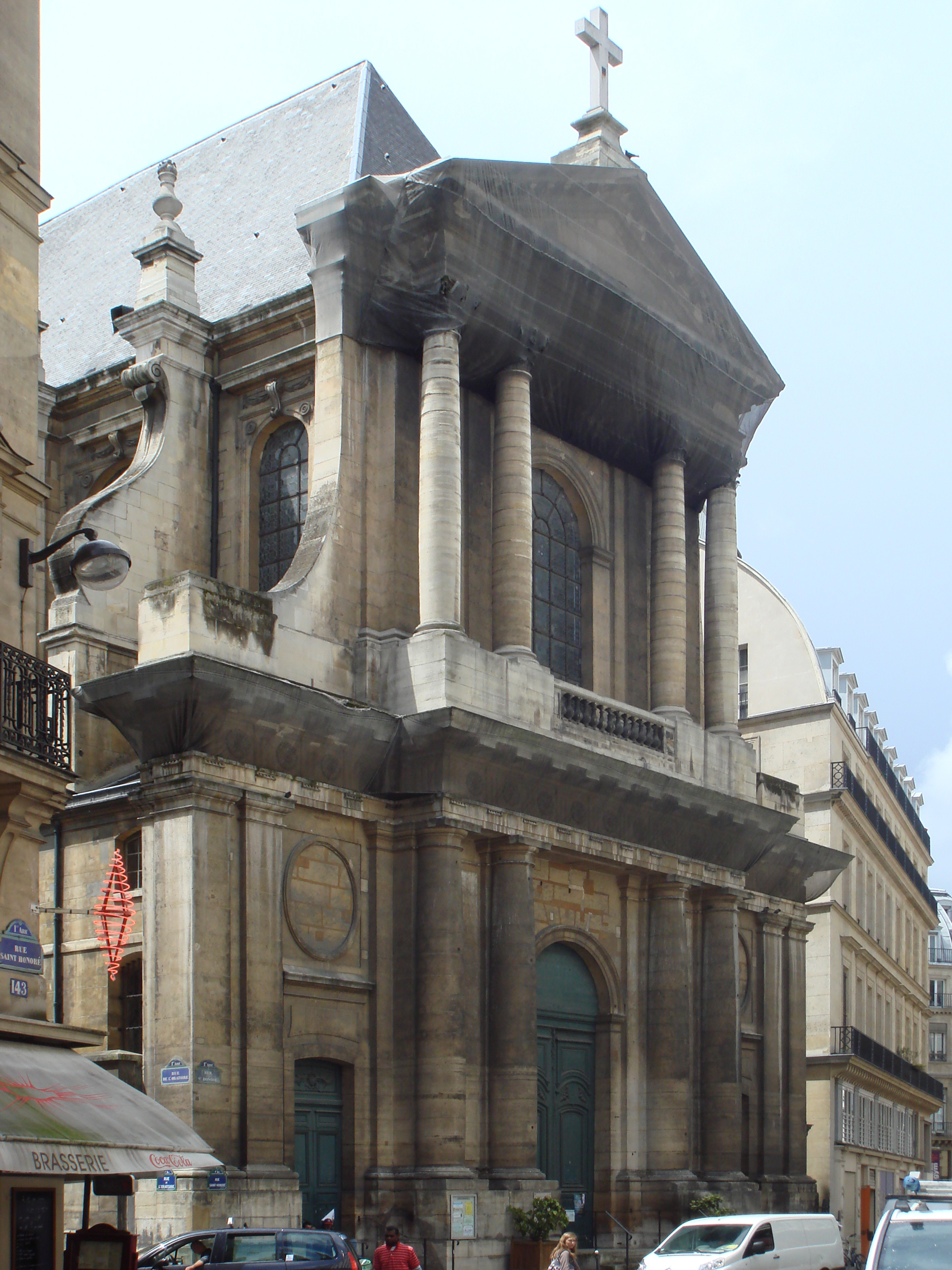
Temple Protestant de l'Oratoire du Louvre (1st arr't)

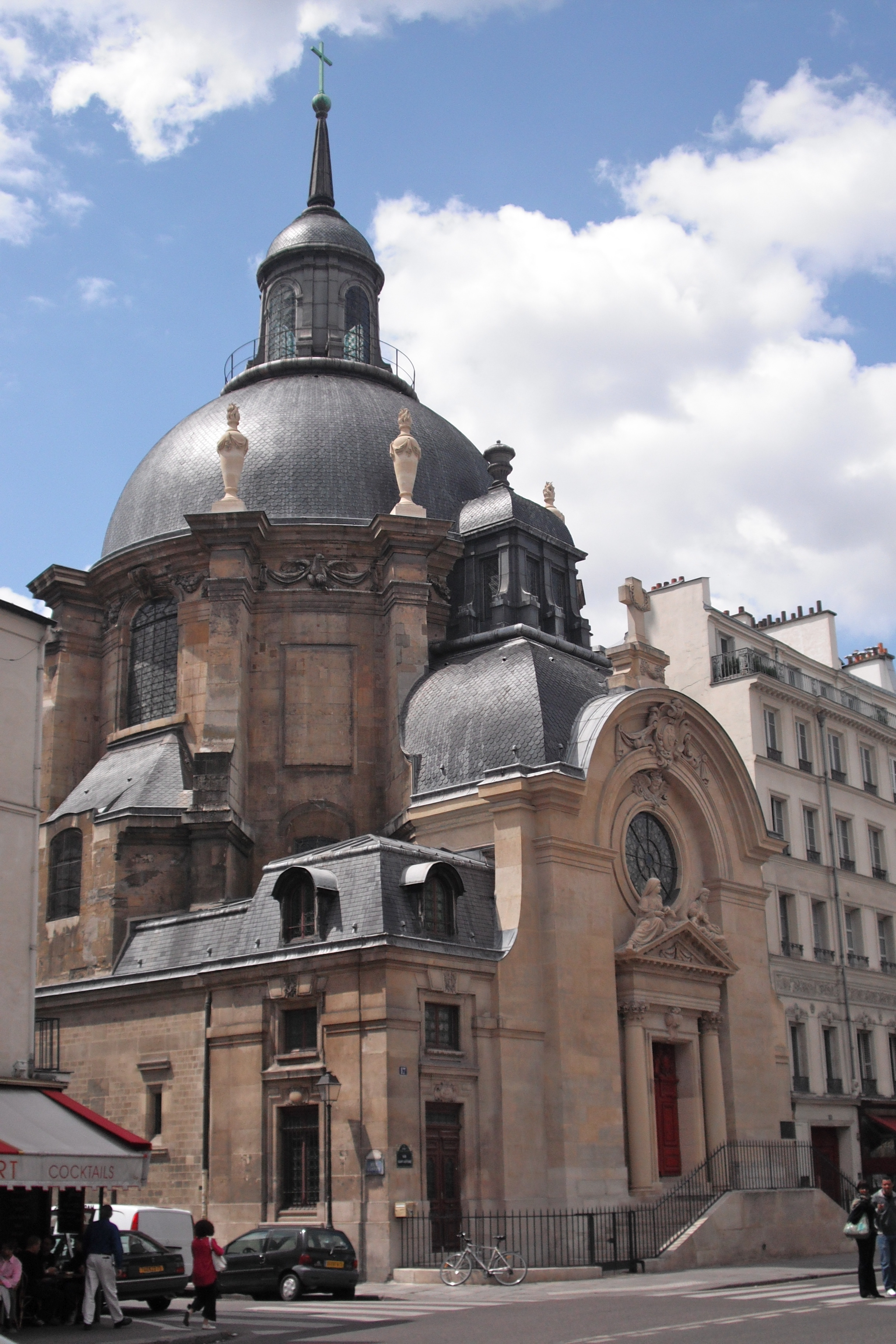
Temple du Marais (4th arr't)

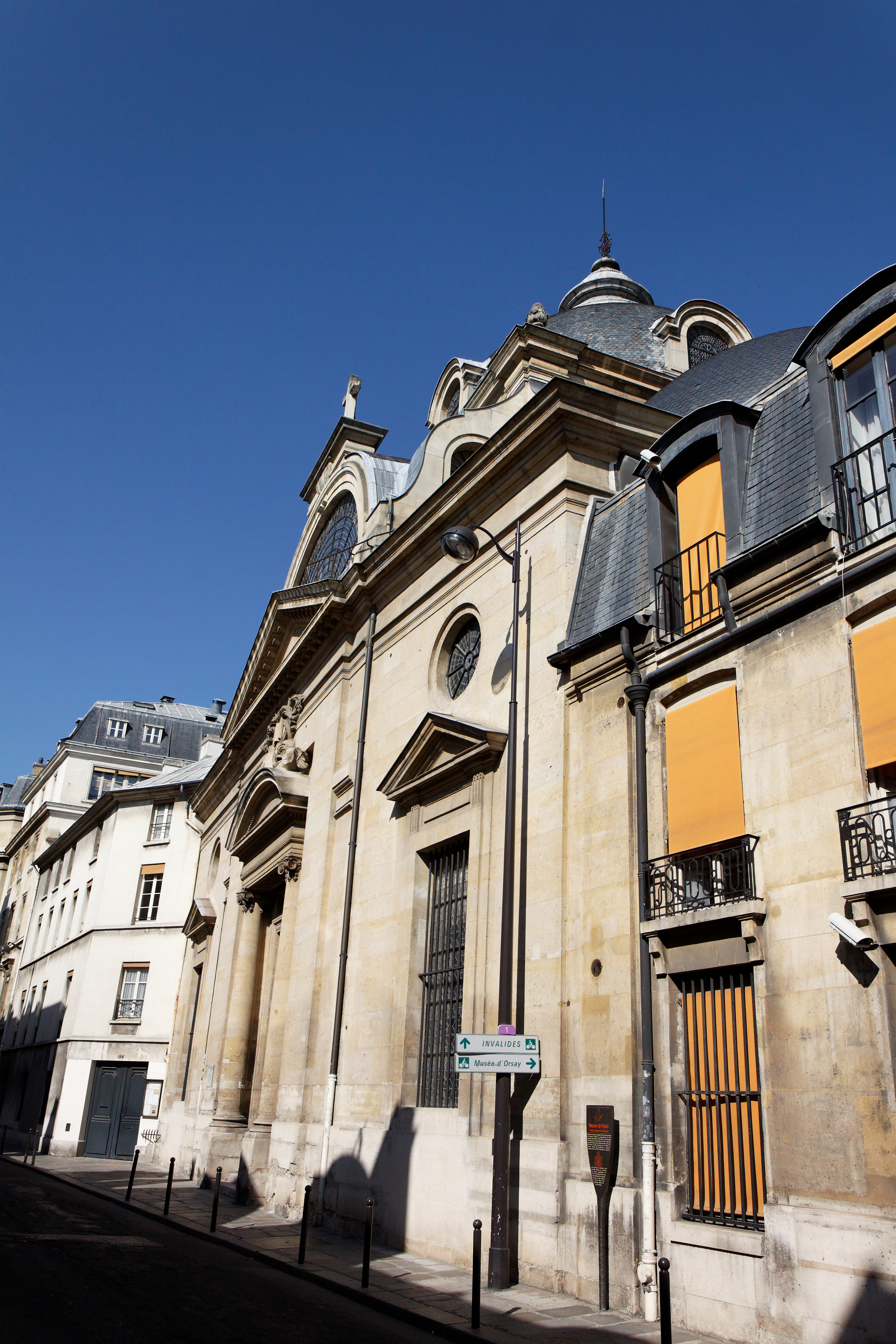
Temple de Pentemont (7th arr't)

- 1st arrondissement:
  - l'Oratoire du Louvre
- 4th arrondissement:
  - Temple du Marais
- 5th arrondissement:
  - Église réformée Maison Fraternelle
  - Église réformée de Port-Royal
- 7th arrondissement:
  - Temple de Pentemont

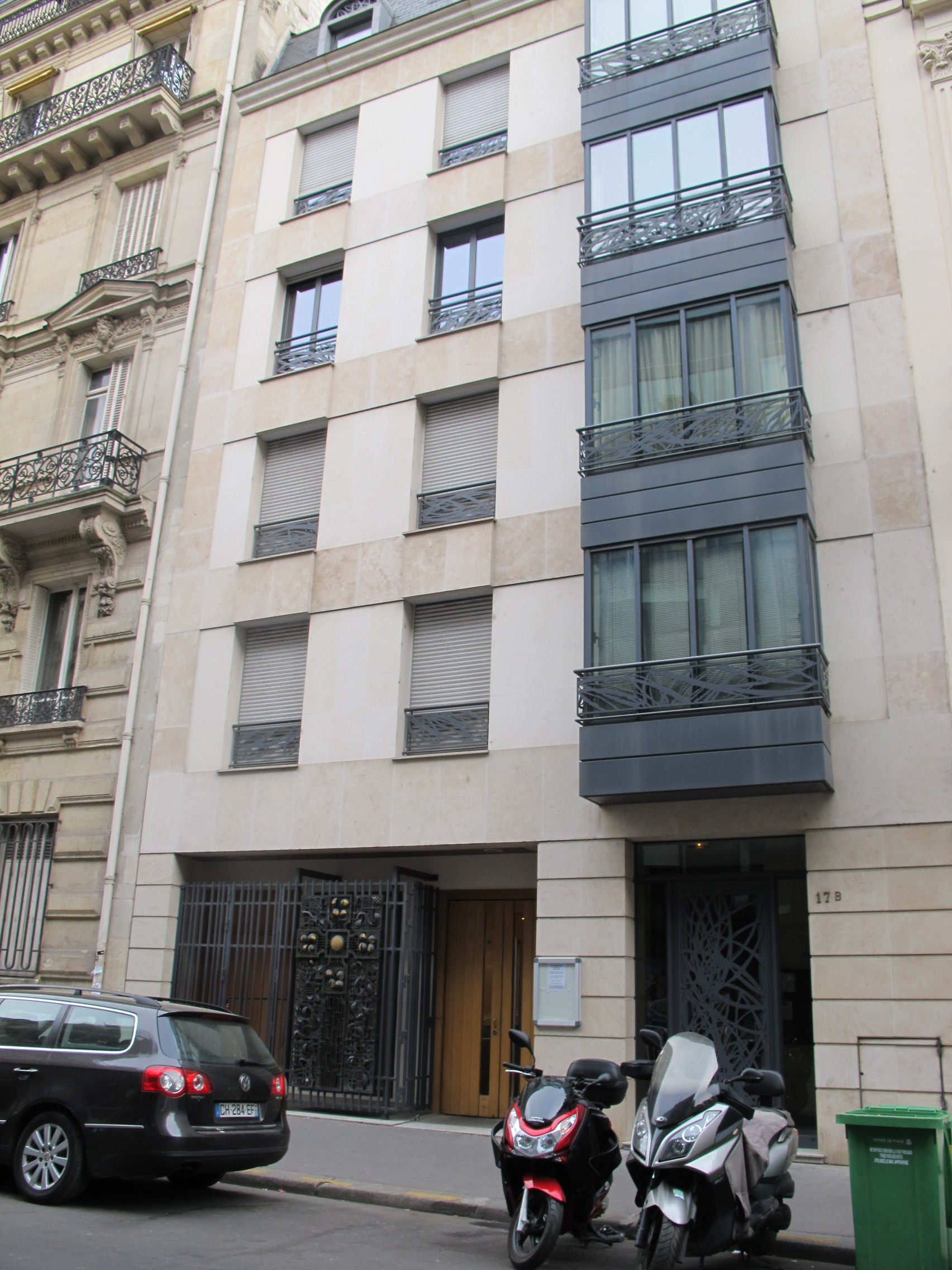
Église écossaise de Paris (8th arr't)

- 8th arrondissement:
  - Église écossaise de Paris
  - Église réformée Saint-Esprit
- 10th arrondissement:
  - Église réformée La Rencontre
- 11th arrondissement:
  - Église réformée du Foyer de l'Âme
- 14th arrondissement:
  - Plaisance Montparnasse
- 16th arrondissement:
  - Église réformée d'Auteuil
  - Église réformée de l'Annonciation
- 17th arrondissement:
  - Église réformée des Batignolles
  - Église réformée d'Étoile
- 20th arrondissement:
  - Église réformée de Belleville
  - Église réformée de Béthanie

=== Salvation Army ===
- 11th arrondissement:
  - Palais de la Femme, 94 Rue de Charonne, 75011 Paris
- 14th arrondissement:
  - Paris Corps, 9 Villa Cœur de Vey, 75014 Paris

=== Seventh-day Adventist Church ===
- 13th arrondissement:
  - Church of 130 bd Hôpital:

=== Ukrainian Catholic Church ===
- Cathedral of Saint Volodymyr the Great, 6th arrondissement

=== United and uniting churches ===
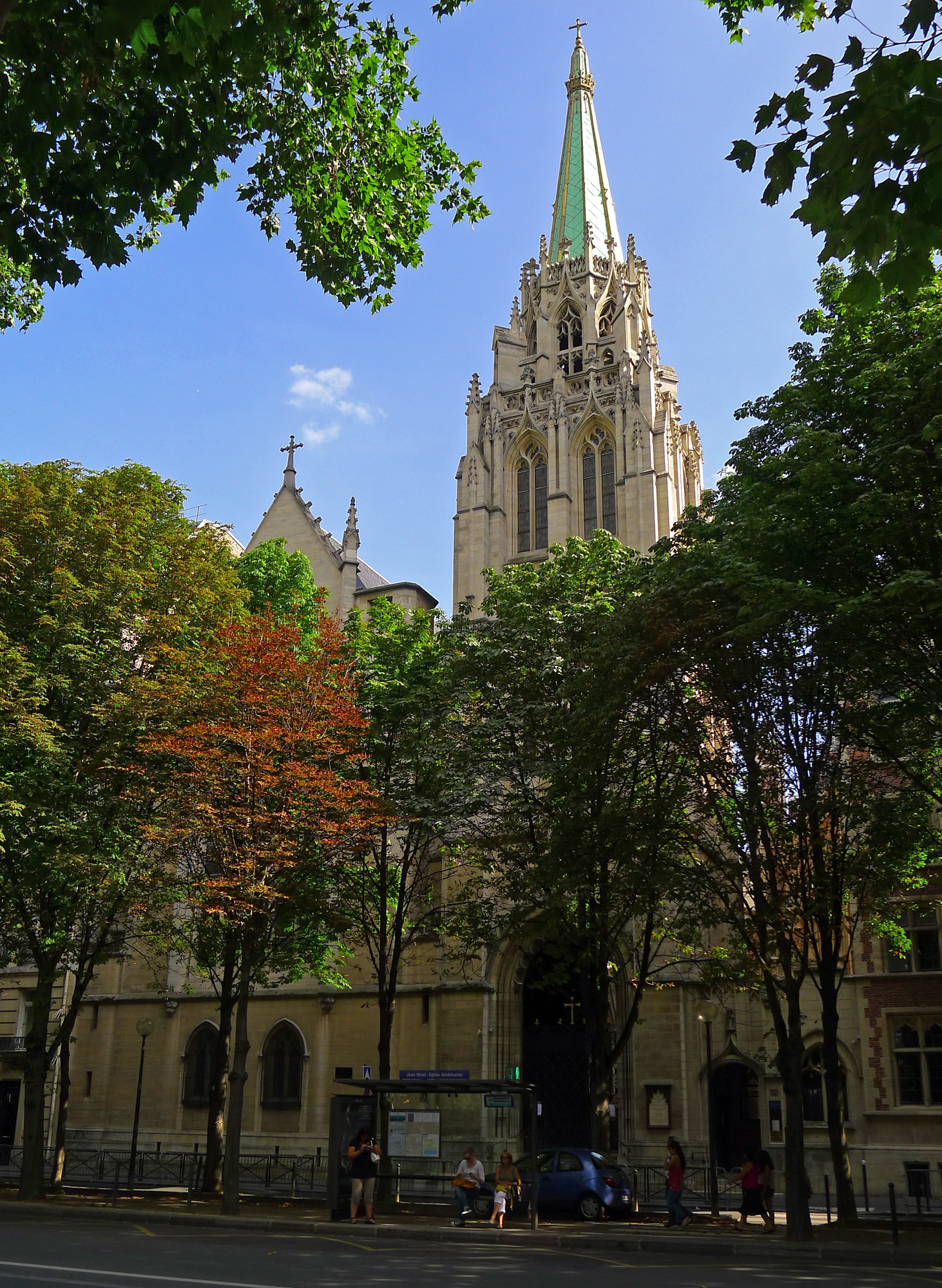
American Church in Paris

- 7th arrondissement:
  - American Church in Paris (Protestant)
- 9th arrondissement:
  - Christuskirche, Paris, German Protestant Church in Paris

== Hinduism ==
- 18th arrondissement:
  - Temple Sri Manika Vinayakar Alayam or Temple de Ganesh

== Islam ==
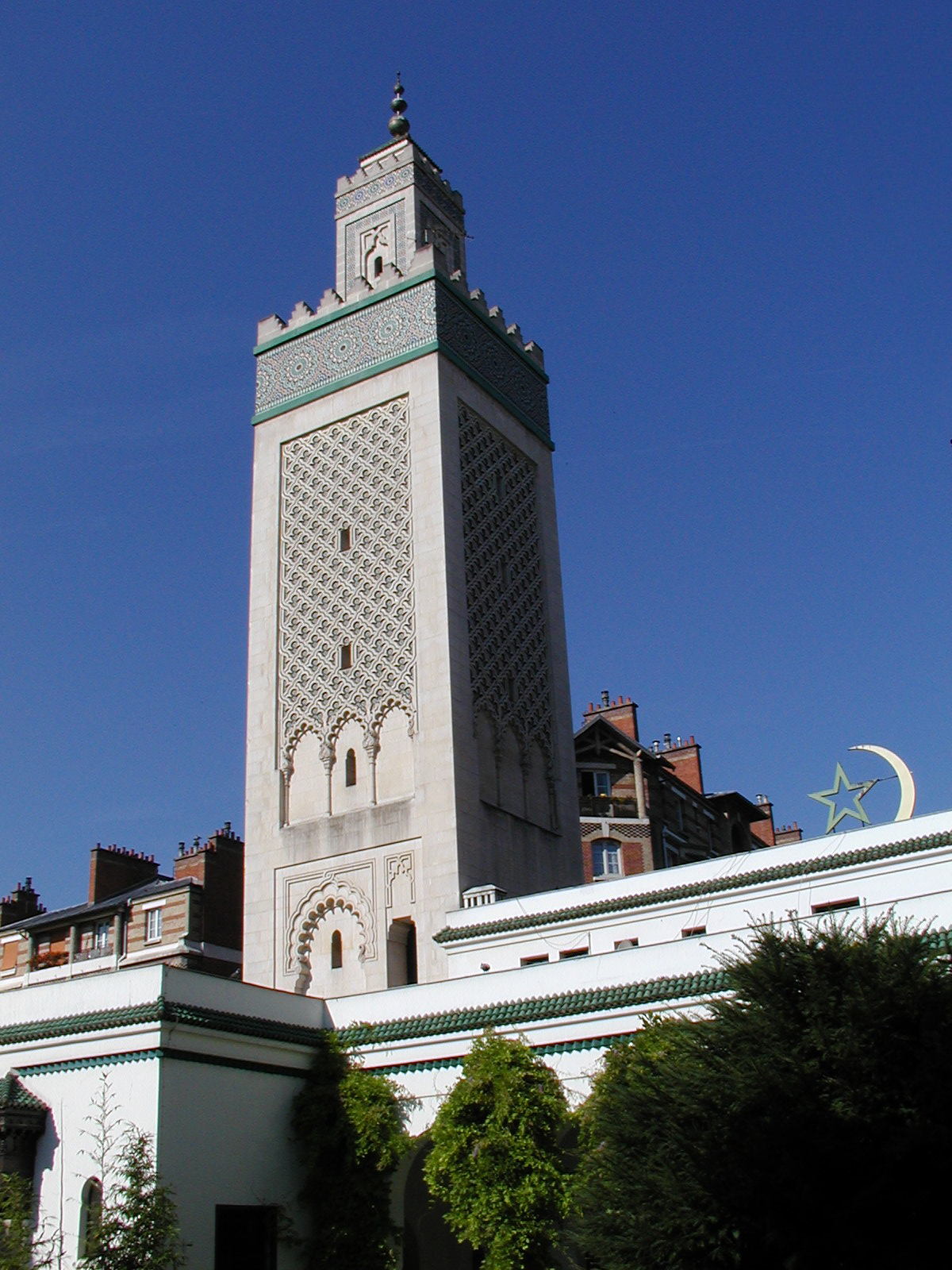
Grande Mosquée de Paris

- 5th arrondissement:
  - Grande Mosquée de Paris
- 10th arrondissement:
  - Mosquée 'Ali Ibn Al Khattab
  - Centre culturel islamique
  - Mosquée Ali ben abi Taleb
  - Mosquée El Fatih
- 11th arrondissement:
  - Mosquée Abou Bakr As Saddiq
  - Mosquée Abou Ayoub Al Ansari
  - Mosquée Omar Ibn Khattab
  - Mosquée Attaqwa
  - Mosquée Alhouda
- 12th arrondissement:
  - Mosquée Attawbah
- 13th arrondissement:
  - Mosquée Othman
- 14th arrondissement:
  - Mosquée de la Maison de Tunisie
  - Mosquée de la Maison du Maroc
- 15th arrondissement:
  - Mosquée de la Ligue islamique mondiale
- 18th arrondissement:
  - Mosquée AbdelMajid
  - Mosquée Khalid Ibn El Walid
  - Mosquée Al-Fath
- 19th arrondissement:
  - Mosquée A Daawa
- 20th arrondissement:
  - Mosquée des Comoriens

== Judaism ==
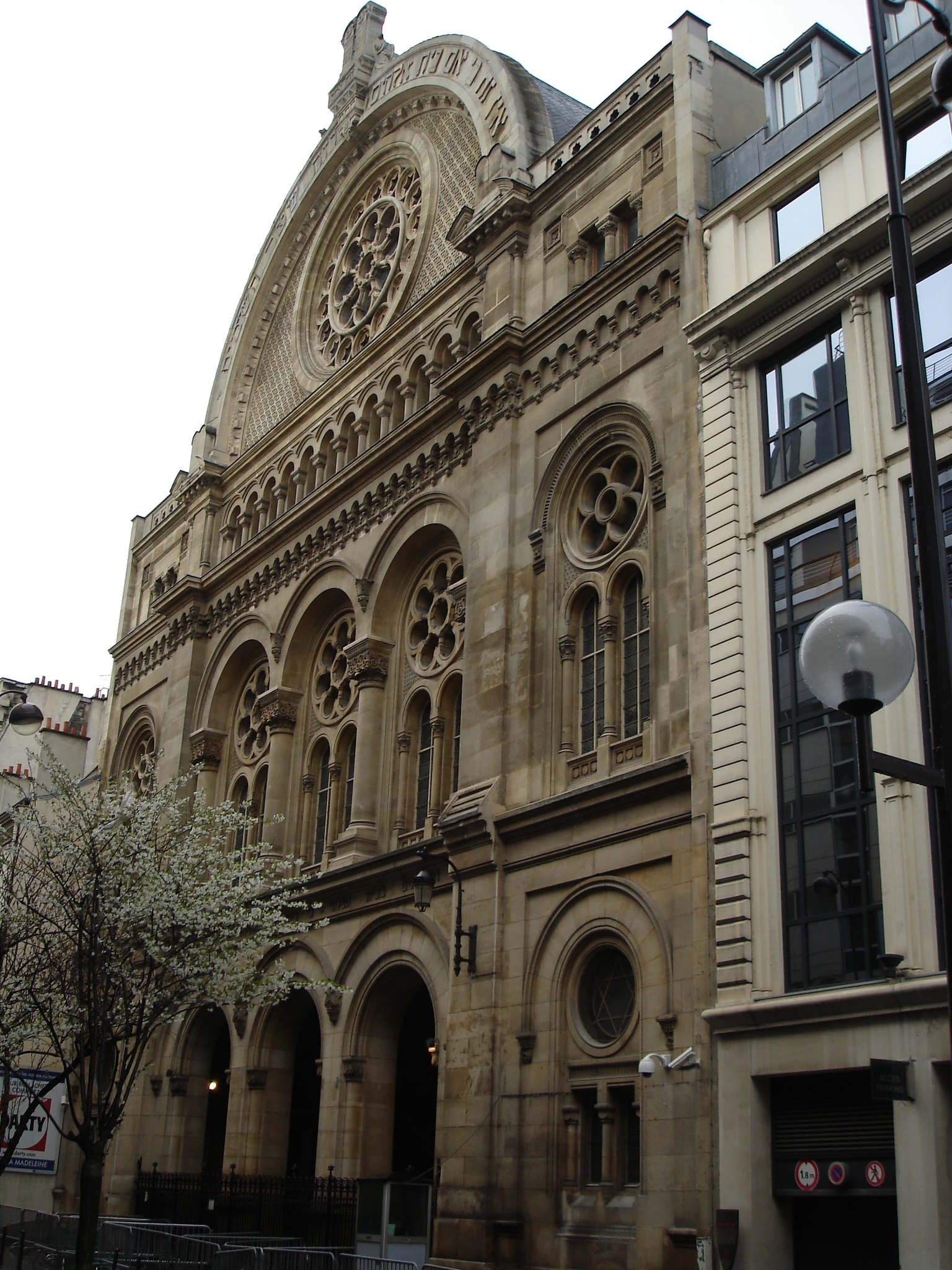
Grand Synagogue of Paris (9th arr't)

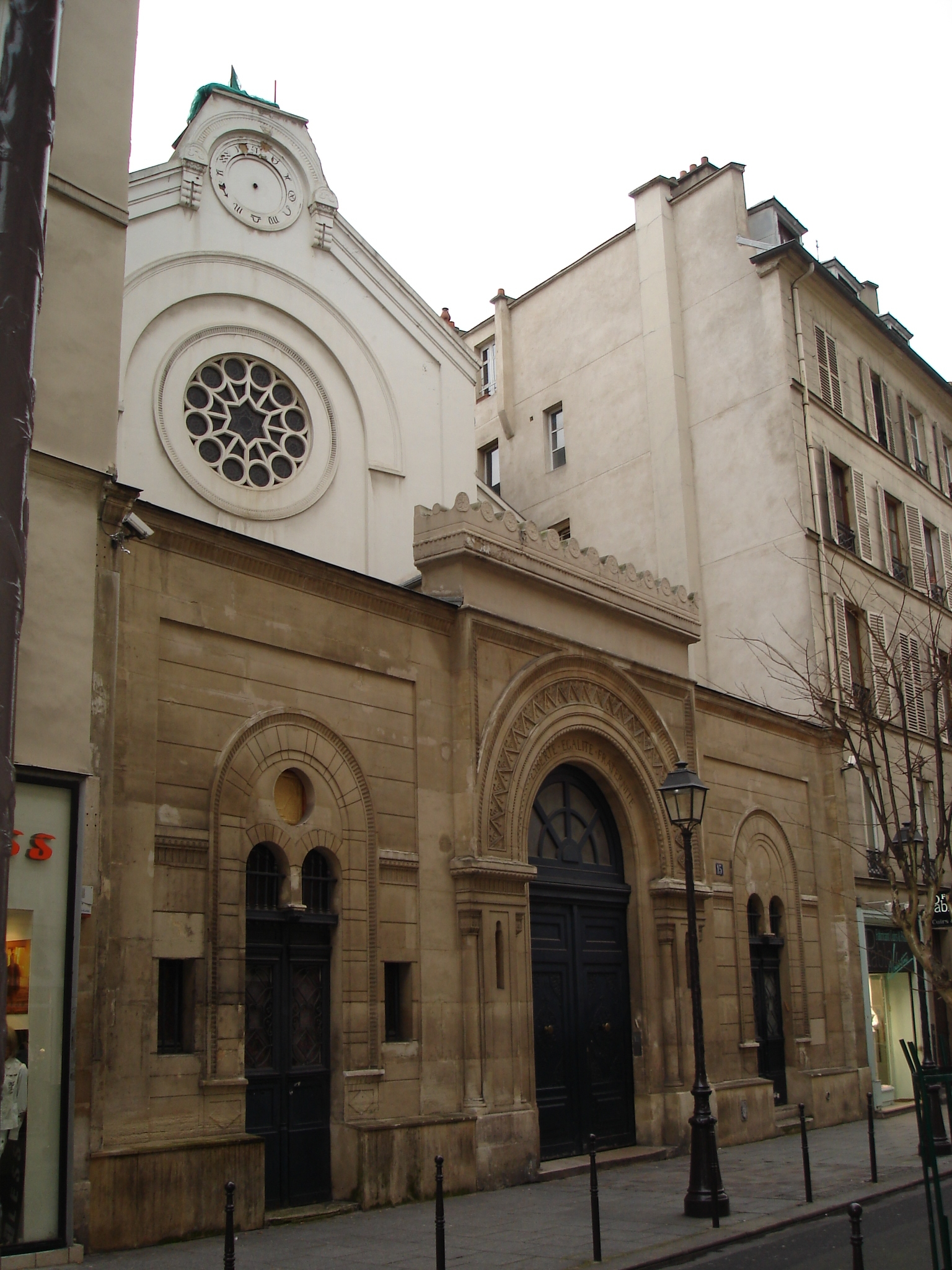
Synagogue de Nazareth (3rd arr't)

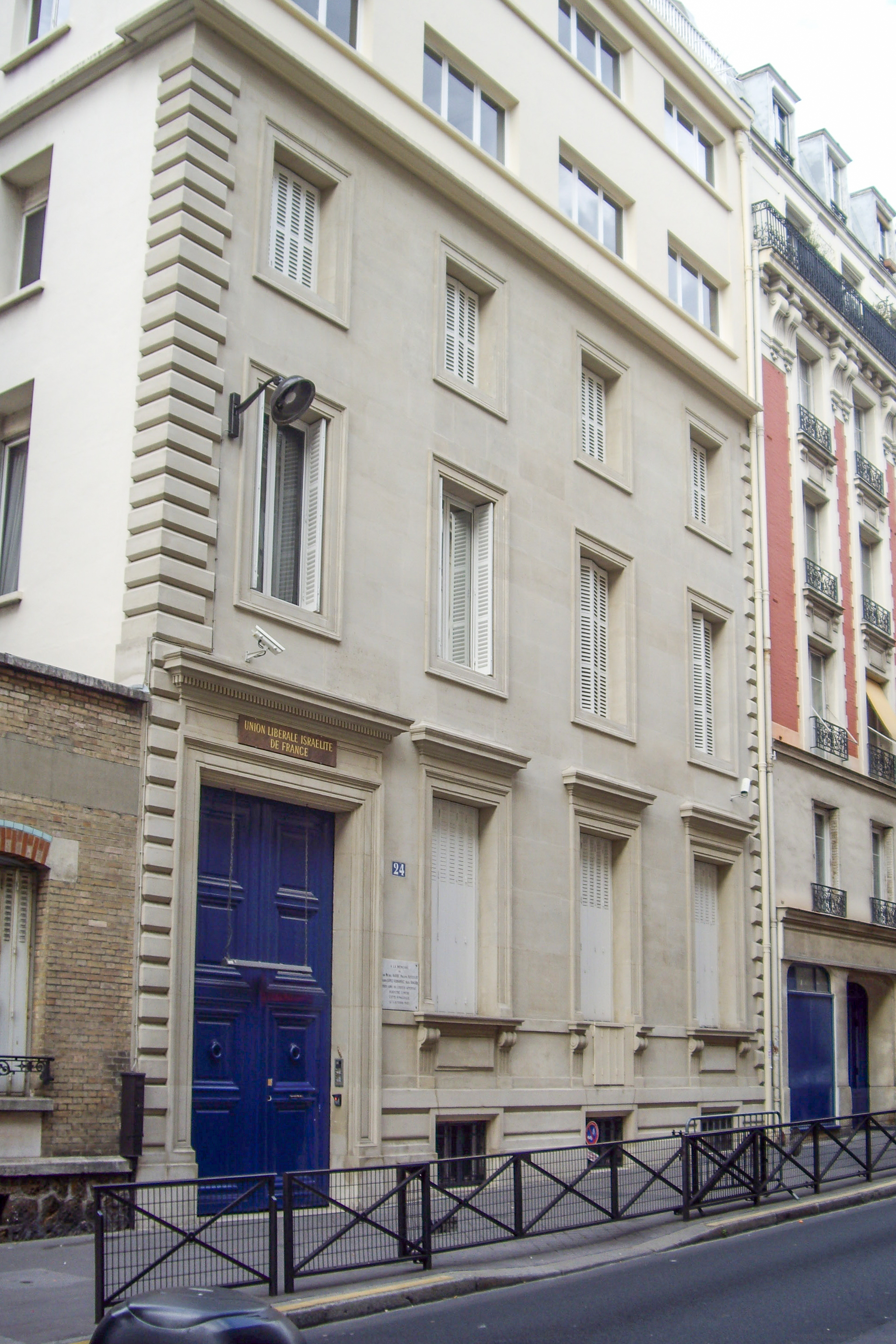
Synagogue Copernic (16th arr't)

Synagogues:

- 3rd arrondissement:
  - Synagogue Nazareth (Orthodox)
- 4th arrondissement:
  - Synagogue de la rue des Tournelles
  - Synagogue de la rue Pavée
  - Synagogue du 17 rue des Rosiers
  - Synagogue du 25 rue des Rosiers
  - Synagogue de la rue du Bourg-Tibourg
  - Synagogue Charles Liché
- 5th arrondissement:
  - Synagogue Vauquelin
- 9th arrondissement:
  - Grand Synagogue of Paris (Orthodox)
  - Synagogue Buffault
  - Synagogue Adas Yereim
  - Synagogue Rashi (Paris)
  - Synagogue Saint-Lazare
- 11th arrondissement:
  - Synagogue Adath Israël
  - Synagogue Don Isaac Abravanel
- 15th arrondissement:
  - Synagogue Adath Shalom (Masorti)
  - Synagogue Chasseloup-Laubat
- 16th arrondissement:
  - Synagogue de la rue Copernic (Reform)
- 17th arrondissement:
  - Edmond J. Safra Synagogue, in the European Jewish Center
- 18th arrondissement:
  - Montmartre Synagogue
  - Synagogue des Saules
  - Synagogue Kedushat Levi
- 19th arrondissement:
  - Synagogue Secrétan
- 20th arrondissement:
  - Synagogue Julien-Lacroix
  - Synagogue de Belleville

== See also ==
- Architecture of France
- Religion in France
- List of historic churches in Paris
- Historic chapels of Paris
