= Church of Saint-George de la Villette =

- Église Saint-Georges de la Villette
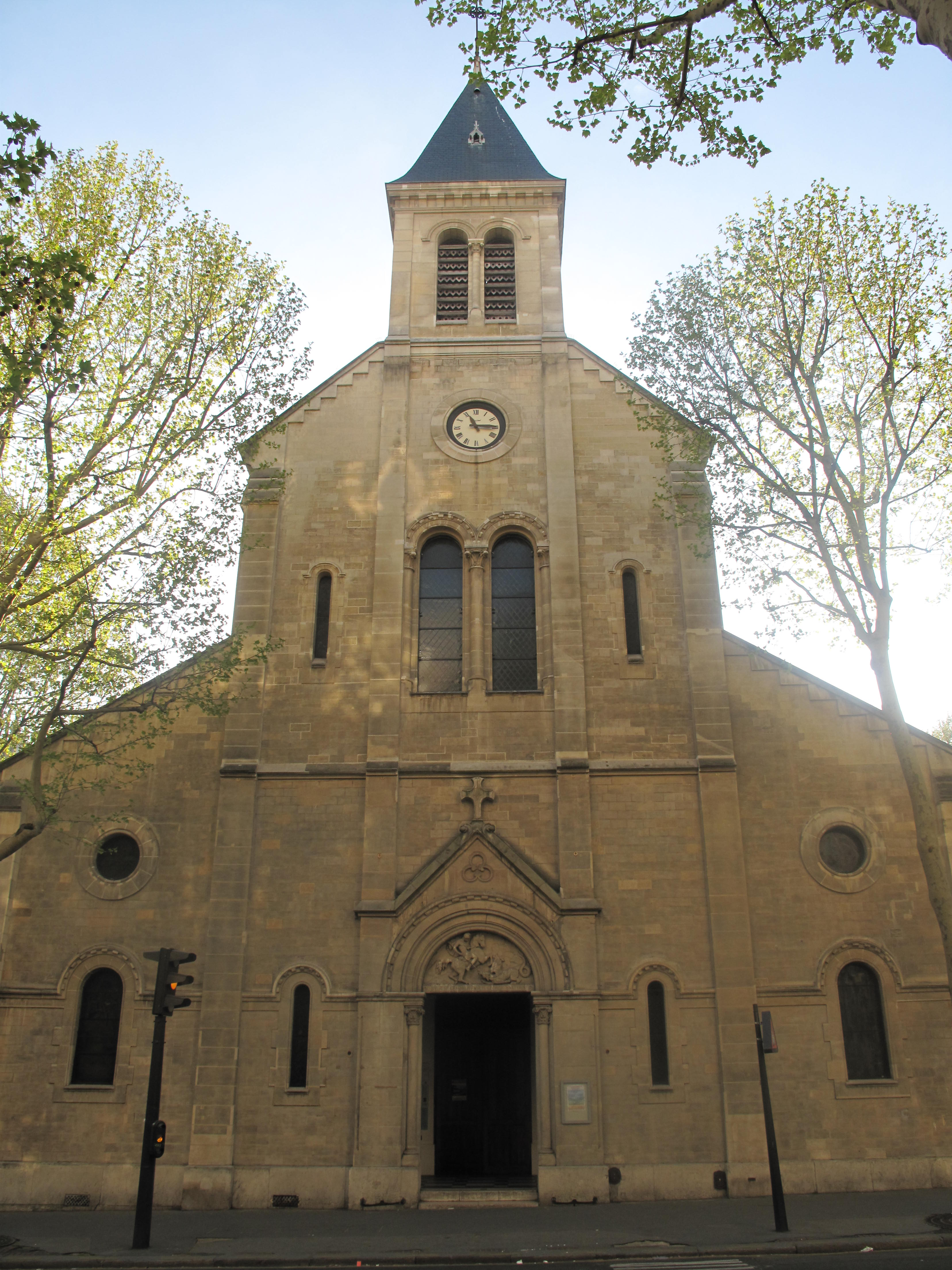
- Church of Saint-George de la Villette
- 48°52′46.1″N 2°22′29.1″E
- Location: 19th arrondissement, Paris
- Country: France
- Denomination: Roman Catholic

History
- Dedication: Saint George

Architecture
- Architect(s): Louis-Pierre Chauvet; Alfred Coulomb
- Style: Romanesque Revival
- Groundbreaking: 1873
- Completed: 1880

Administration
- Diocese: Archdiocese of Paris

The Church of Saint-George de la Villette (French: L'église Saint-Georges de la Villette) is a Catholic church located at 112-114 avenue Simon-Bolivar in the 19th arrondissement of Paris.

== History ==
It was built starting in 1873 according to the plans of the architect Louis-Pierre Chauvet and it was completed in 1880 under the direction of Alfred Coulomb. The church is dedicated to Saint George, in the memory of Georges Darboy, the Archbishop of Paris, executed on 24 May 1871 as a hostage during the Semaine sanglante, the final part of the Paris Commune. Its first parish priest was Alfred Caillebotte, a half-brother of Gustave Caillebotte.
