= Embassy of Burundi in France =

Diplomatic mission of Burundi in France

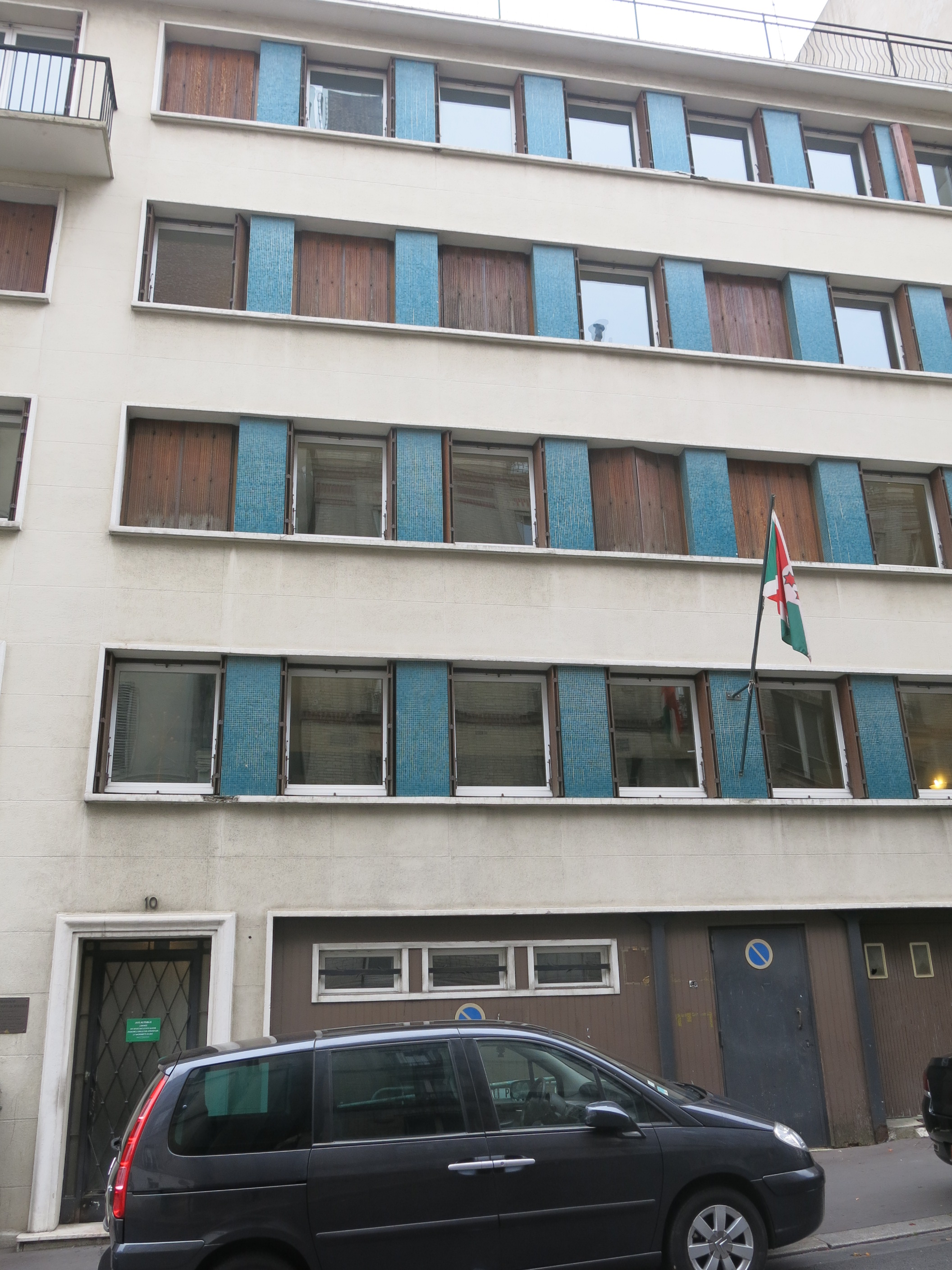
- Address: 10-12, Orme Street
- Coordinates: 48.878373°N 2.400287°E
- Ambassador: Spés Caritas Njebarikanuje
- Website: www.ambassade-du-burundi.fr

The embassy of Burundi in France is the diplomatic mission of Burundi to France. The ambassador of Burundi to France is also accredited as the ambassador to Spain, Portugal and Monaco (in residence in Paris) and also represents Burundi in the Organisation internationale de la Francophonie. Since 2026, its ambassador is Spés Caritas Njebarikanuje.

== Embassy ==
The embassy is located on Orme Street in the 19th arrondissement of Paris.

== Consulates ==
Burundi has 3 honorary consulates in France: in Bordeaux, Montpellier and in Lyon.

== Ambassadors of Burundi to France ==
Since 1993, the ambassadors of Burundi to France are:

Date of issue of letters of credence	Ambassador
9 December 1992	Philippe Kanonko
24 November 1993	Edonias Niyongabo
27 March 1995	Fulgence Dwima Bakana
22 July 1997	Jean Baptiste Mbonyingingo
26 October 1998	Vénérand Bakevyumusaya
9 October 2002	Liboire Ngendahayo
13 October 2006	Ildephonse Nkeramihigo
15 September 2008	Claude Nimubona-Gatogato
6 June 2011	Gaspard Musavyarabona
13 July 2013	Dieudonné Ndabarushimana
13 October 2017	Christine-Nina Niyonsavye
10 December 2019	Ernest Niyokindi
22 September 2023	Isaïe Kubwayo
25 March 2026	Spés Caritas Njebarikanuje

== See also ==
=== Related articles ===
- Embassy of France, Bujumbura
