= Saint-Jacques-Saint-Christophe de la Villette =

Church located in Paris, France

Coordinates: 48°53′21″N 2°22′47″E

Saint-Jacques-Saint-Christophe de la Villette, Paris
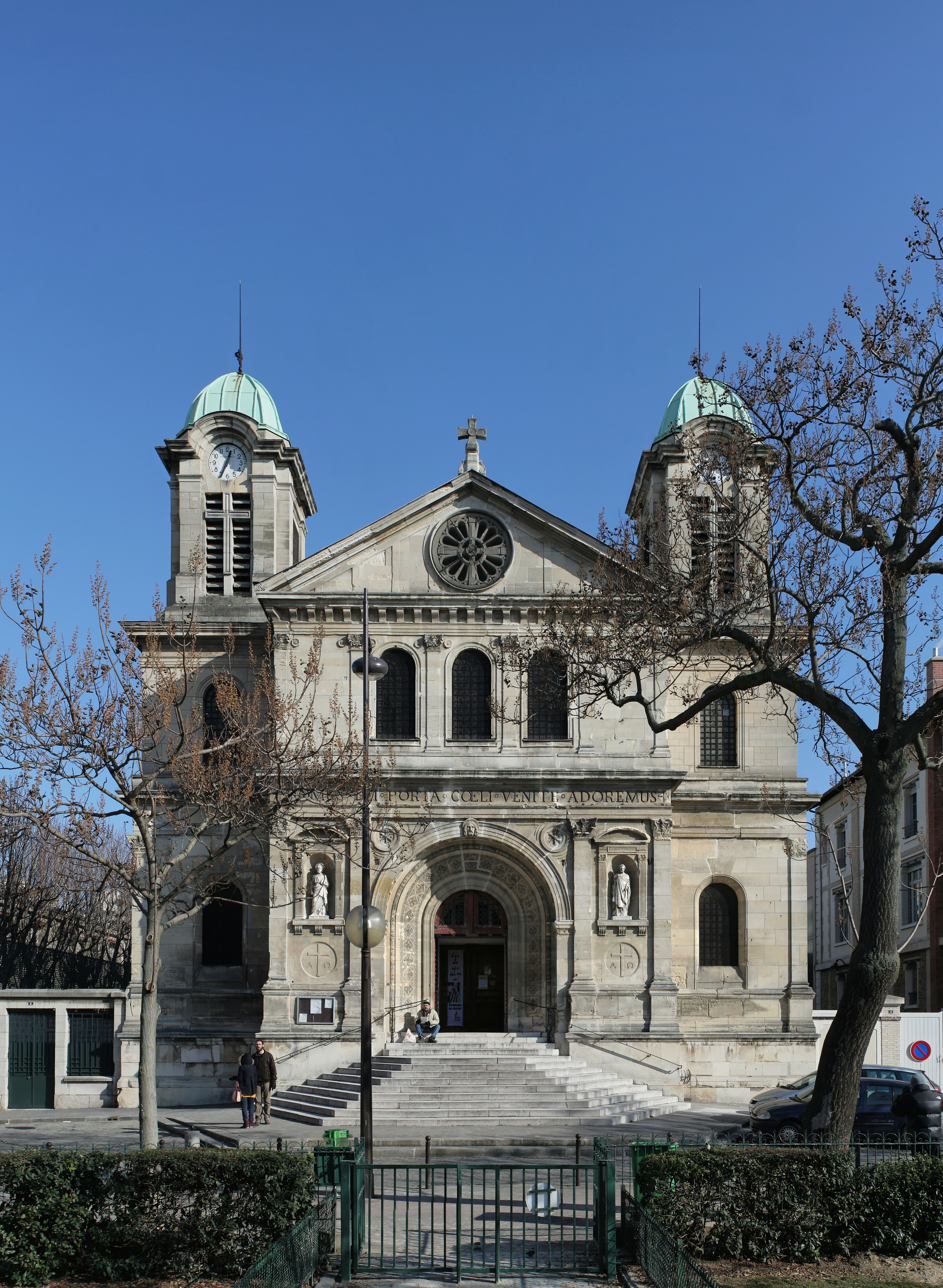
- Saint-Jacques-Saint-Christophe de la Villette
- Saint-Jacques-Saint-Christophe de la Villette, Paris
- Location: 6, place de Bitche, 19th arrondissement of Paris
- Denomination: Catholic Church
- Sui iuris church: Latin Church
- Tradition: Roman Rite

History
- Dedication: Saint Jacob, Saint Christopher

Architecture
- Architect: Paul-Eugene Lequeux
- Style: Neoclassical architecture
- Groundbreaking: 1841
- Completed: 1844

Administration
- Province: Archdiocese of Paris

Saint-Jacques-Saint-Christophe de la Villette is a Roman-Catholic Church located at 6, place de Bitche, between the Square Serge-Reggiani and the Place de Joinville in the 19th arrondissement of Paris. It was built between 1841 et 1844 in the Neoclassical style.

== History ==
The neighbourhood of the church had been a largely rural area until the nineteenth century, growing grain, fruit and grapes. It also lay along the ancient Roman road connecting Paris with Flanders and Germany. A small church was built there in the 14th century for the pilgrims making the pilgrimage to Santiago de Compostela.

The construction of the Ourcq Canal to bring drinking water and commerce from Flanders and Paris, begun by Napoleon in 1802 and completed in 1822, led to a great increase in the population of the neighbourhood, and the need for a larger new church. In 1837 King Louis Philippe authorised the city buy a parcel of land along the Ourcq Canal.

The architect selected to build the new church was of the new church was Paul-Eugene Lequeux, whose other Paris churches included Notre-Dame de Clignancourt in the 18th arrondissement.

== Exterior ==
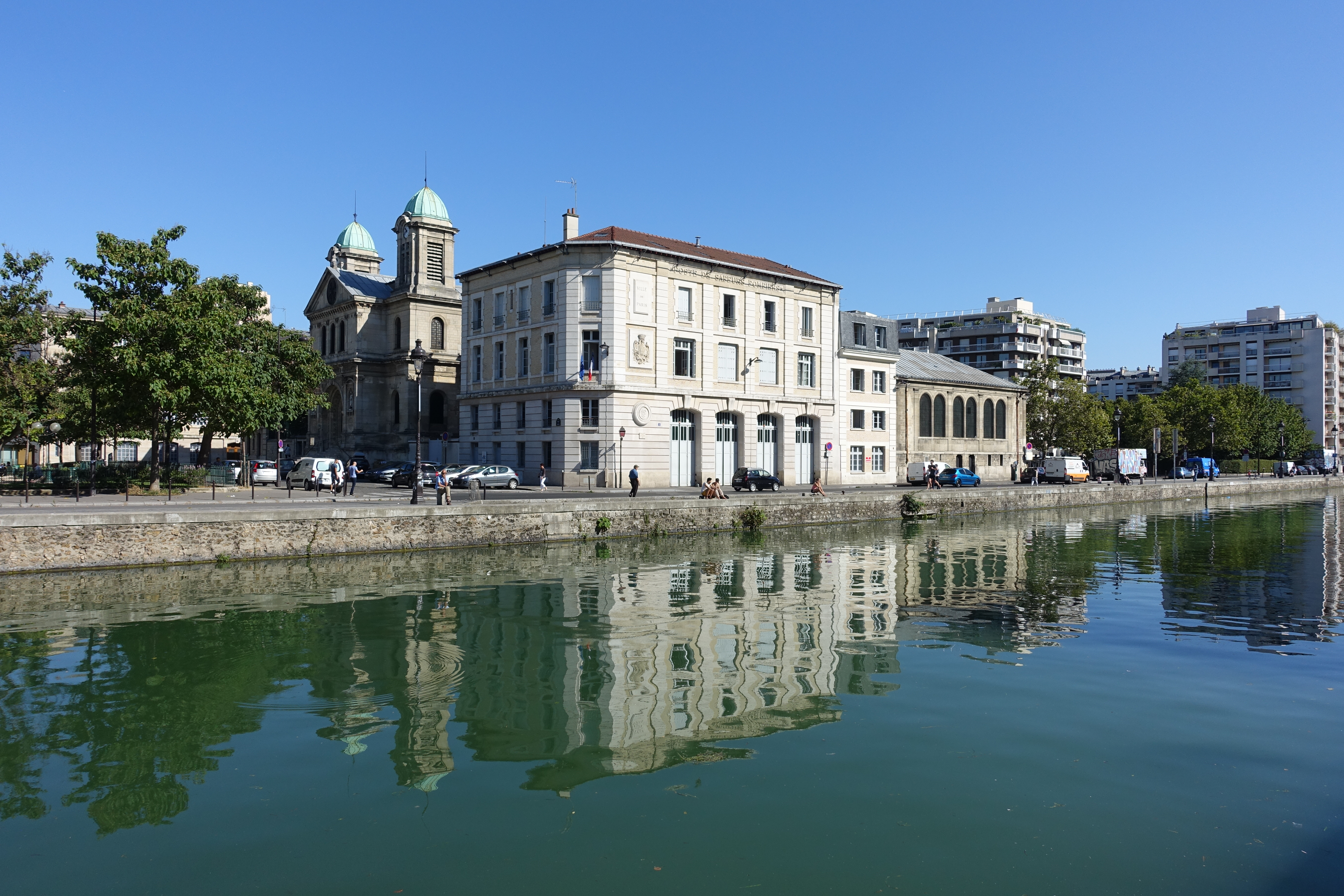
The church (partly hidden) in a park along the Ourcq Canal

The neoclassical facade has a porch, "en saillie", or thrust forward, a common feature of Italian churches. Corinthian columns support the porch, while the upper level has a composite style. The two towers were added later, between the First and Second World Wars. The niches on the facade hold statues of Saint James and Saint Christopher, the patron saints of the church, both worn by time. The text over the portal reads, in Latin, "House of God, Doorway to Heaven, Come adore him with us."

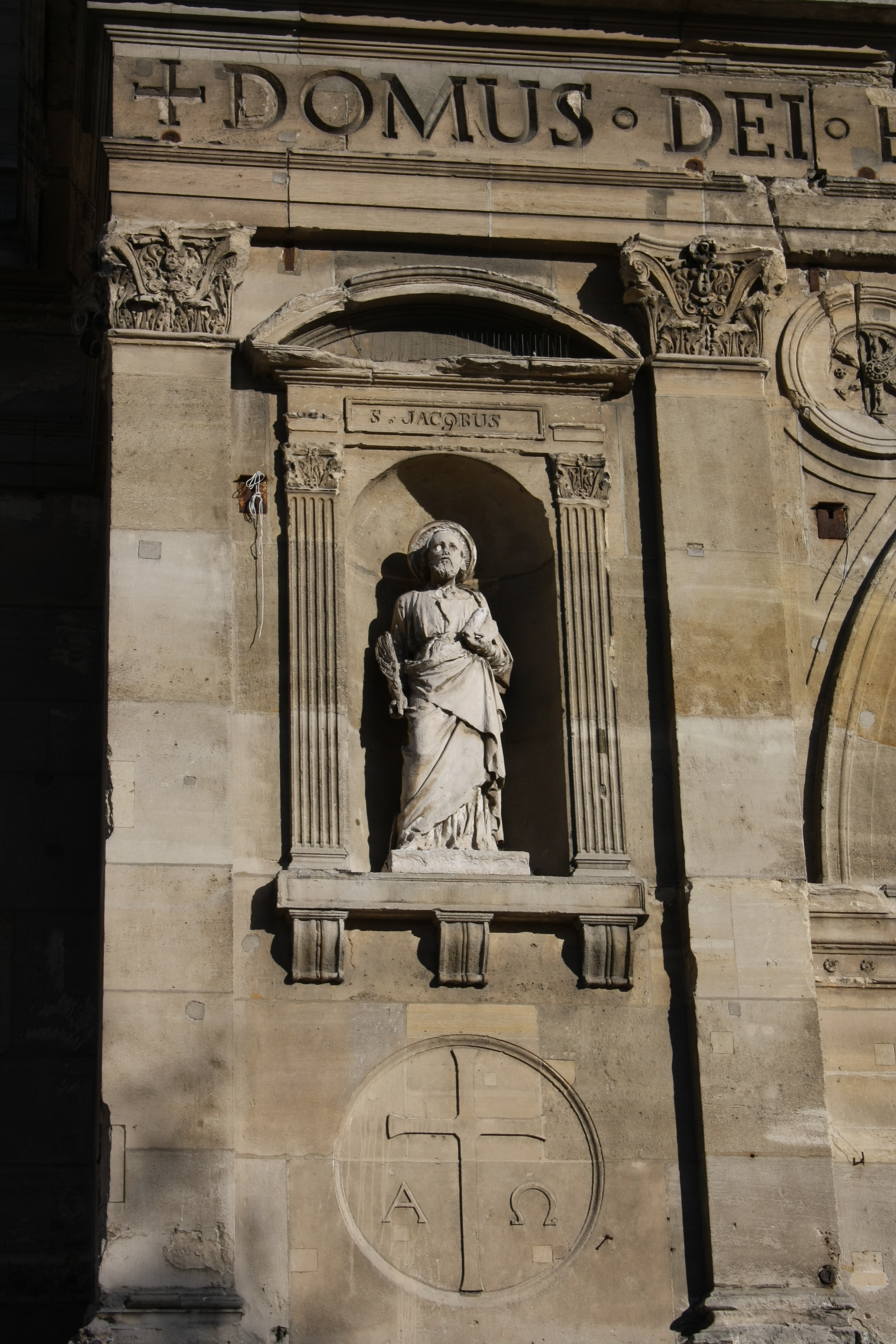
Saint James

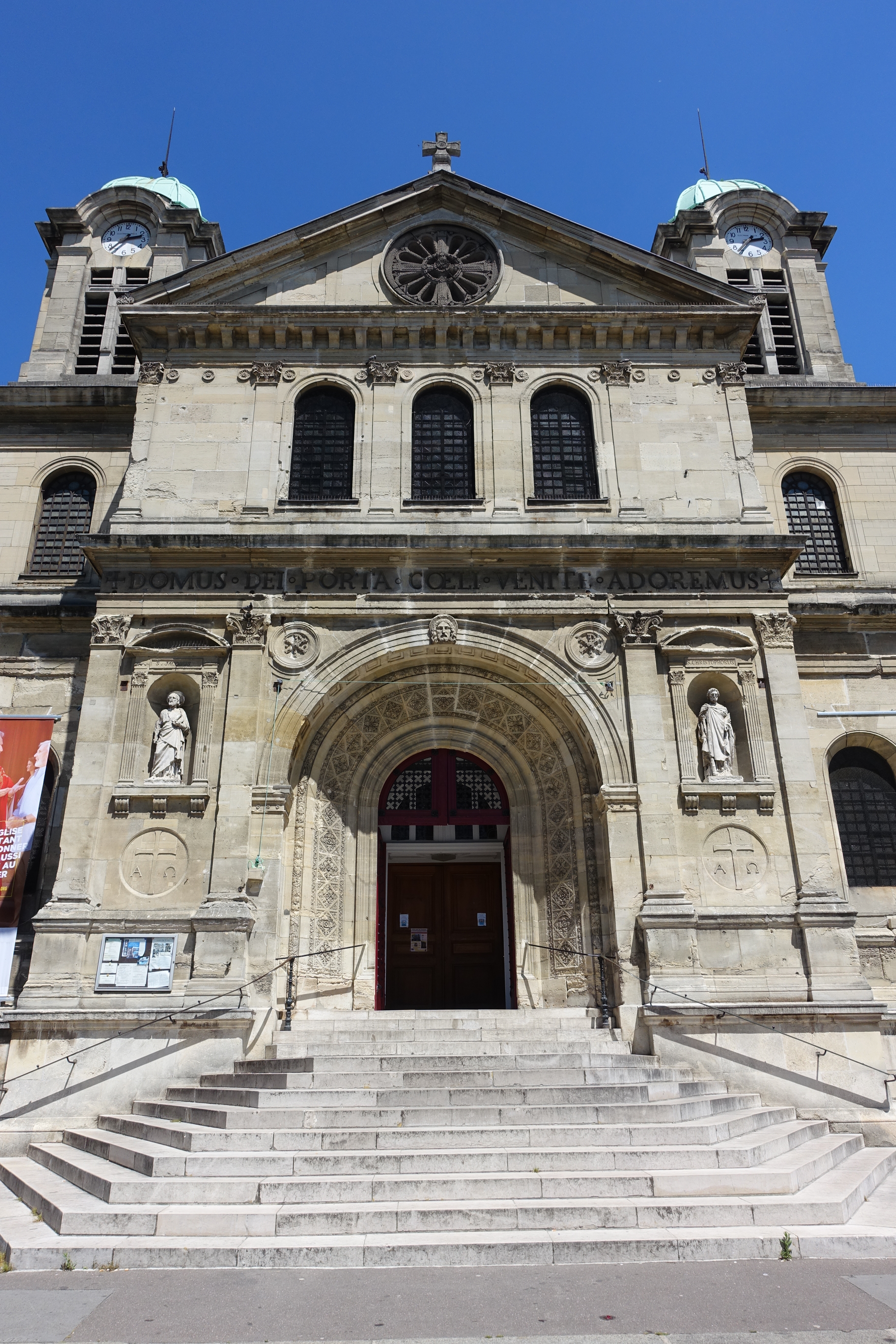
The facade, with an expended porch

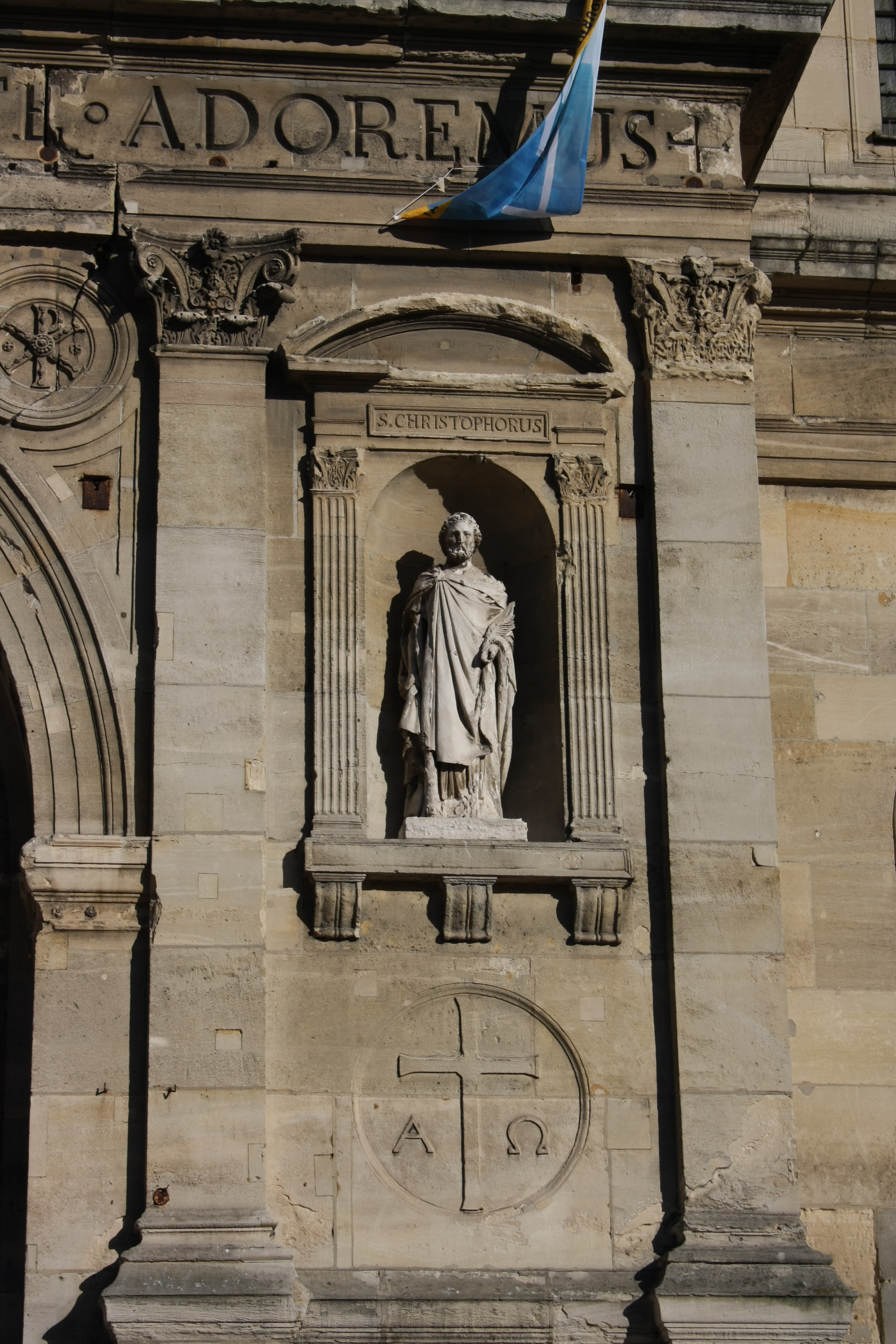
Saint Christopher

== Interior ==
The interior style has features of classical architecture which resemble the style of ancient Roman basilicas. The nave is separated from the outer aisles by rows of Doric columns which support the upper windows. The central portion of the church is covered by a roof painted to resemble wood, which is divided into compartments filled with mosaics, and decorated with gilding and pendants.

The choir was enlarged in 1930, making space for frescoes on the walls behind the altar. The frescoes, by G. Leduc, depict the patron saints, Saint Jacob and Saint Christopher.

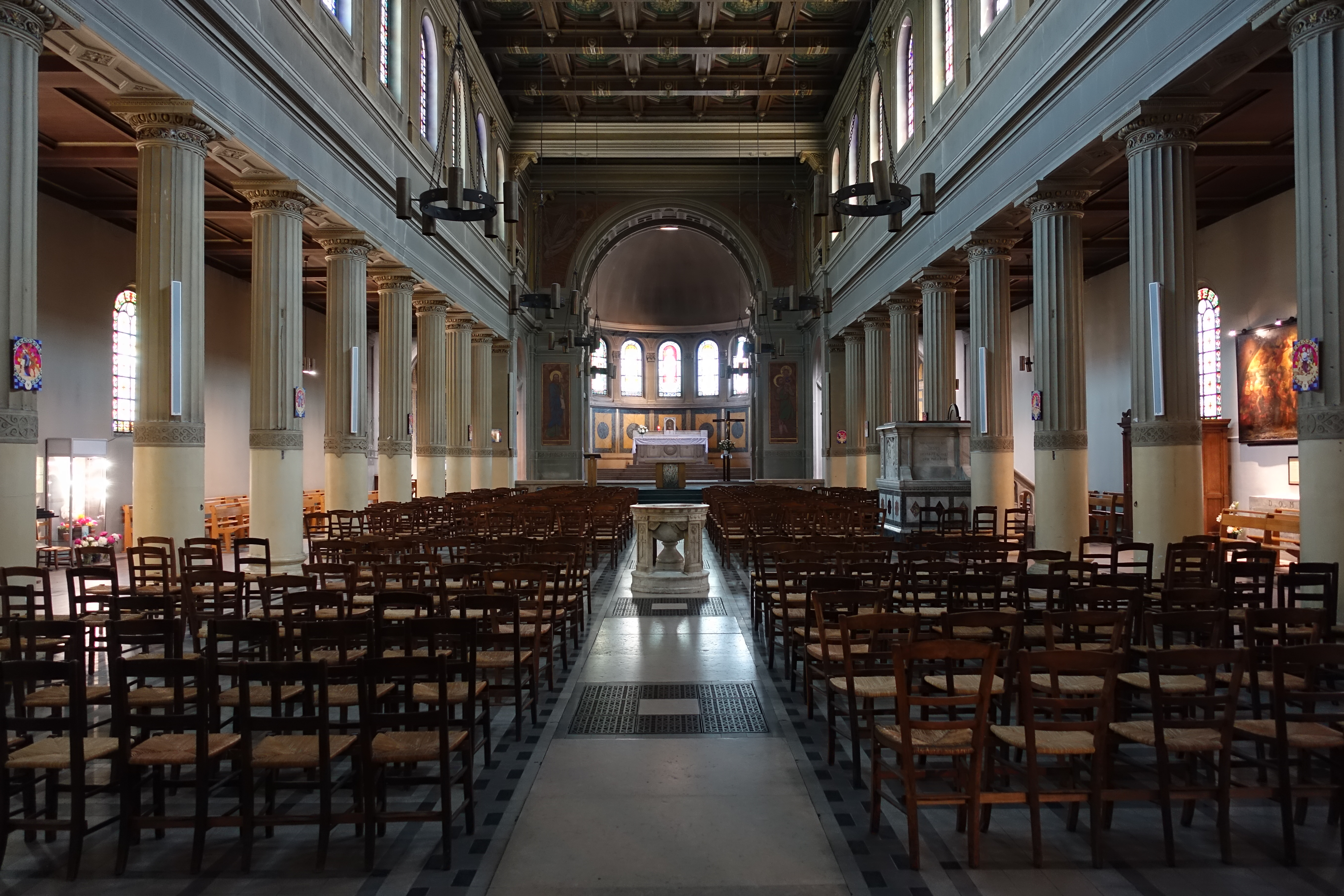
The nave facing the choir

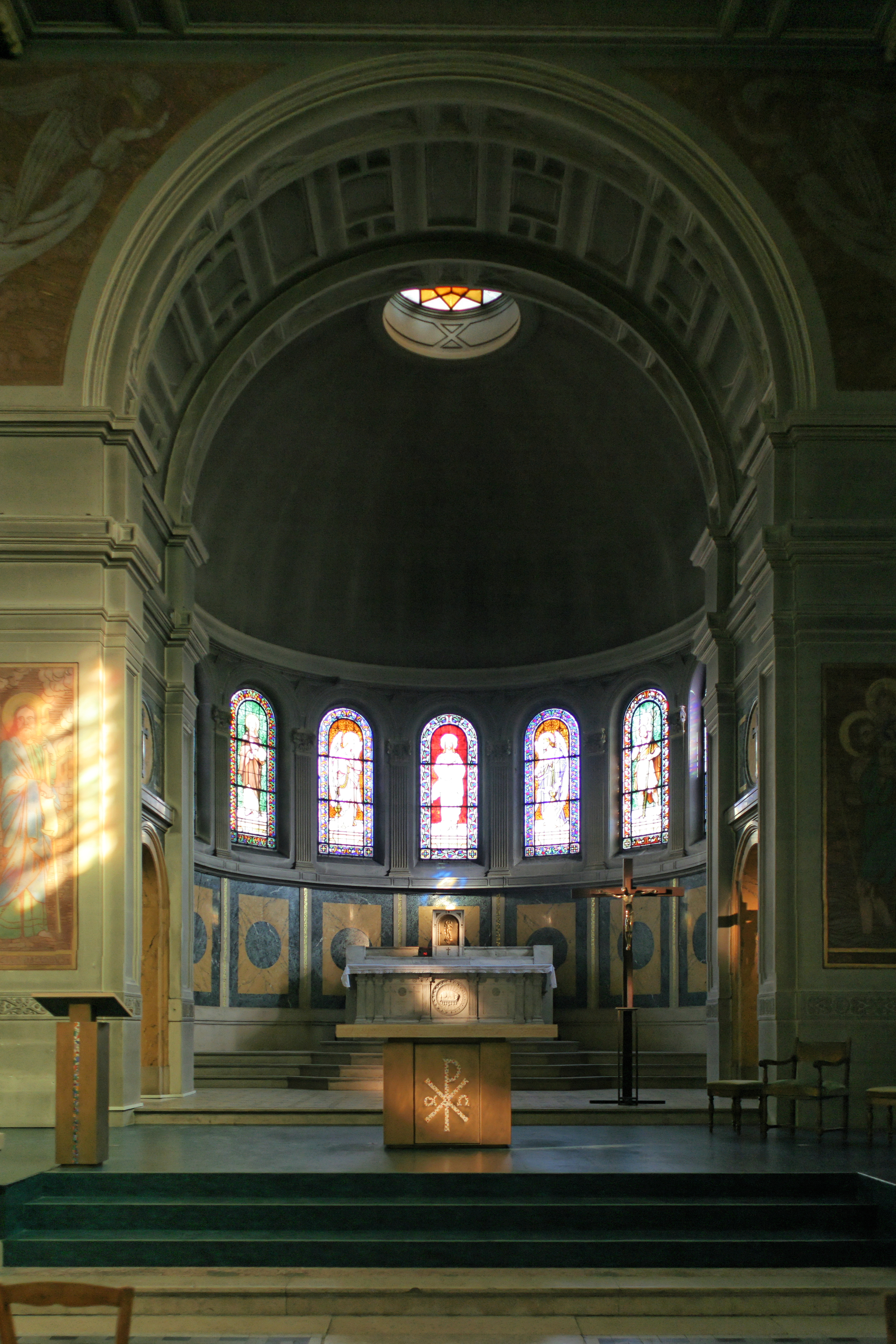
Apse of the choir and the altar

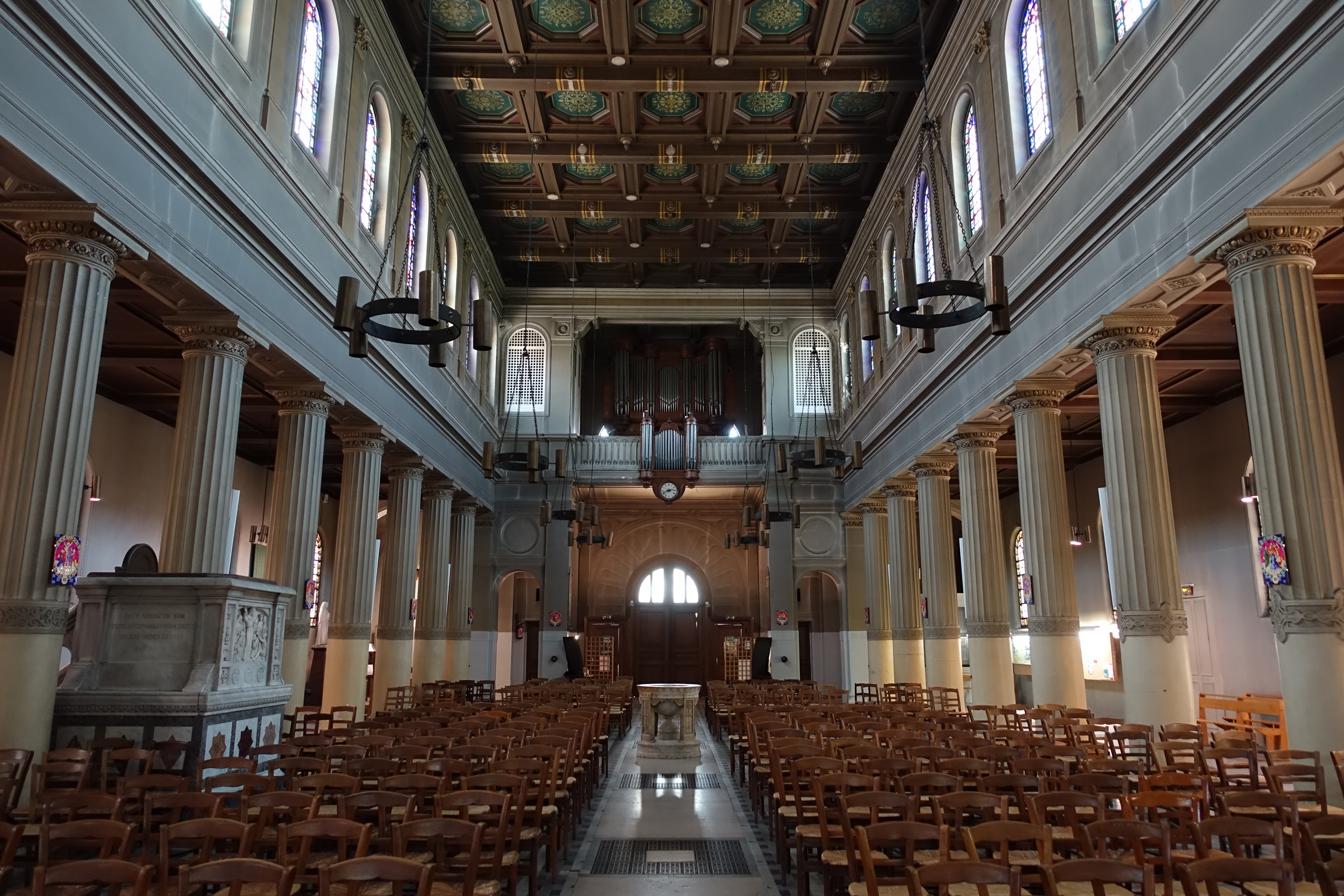
The nave facing the tribune, with the pulpit on the left

== Art and decoration ==
=== Stained glass ===
The church has a notable collection of stained glass windows. The seven major windows depict Biblical figures, and are located in the chancel, behind the altar. They were created by the workshop Charles Champigneulle in 1921. Seven of the windows represent Biblical figures. Christ is located in the centre, and has two angels on each side. The other chancel windows depict Saint Christopher, Saint James, Saint Paul and Saint Peter. A majority of the windows on the upper level have geometric designs, and are intended to bring a maximum amount of light into the church.

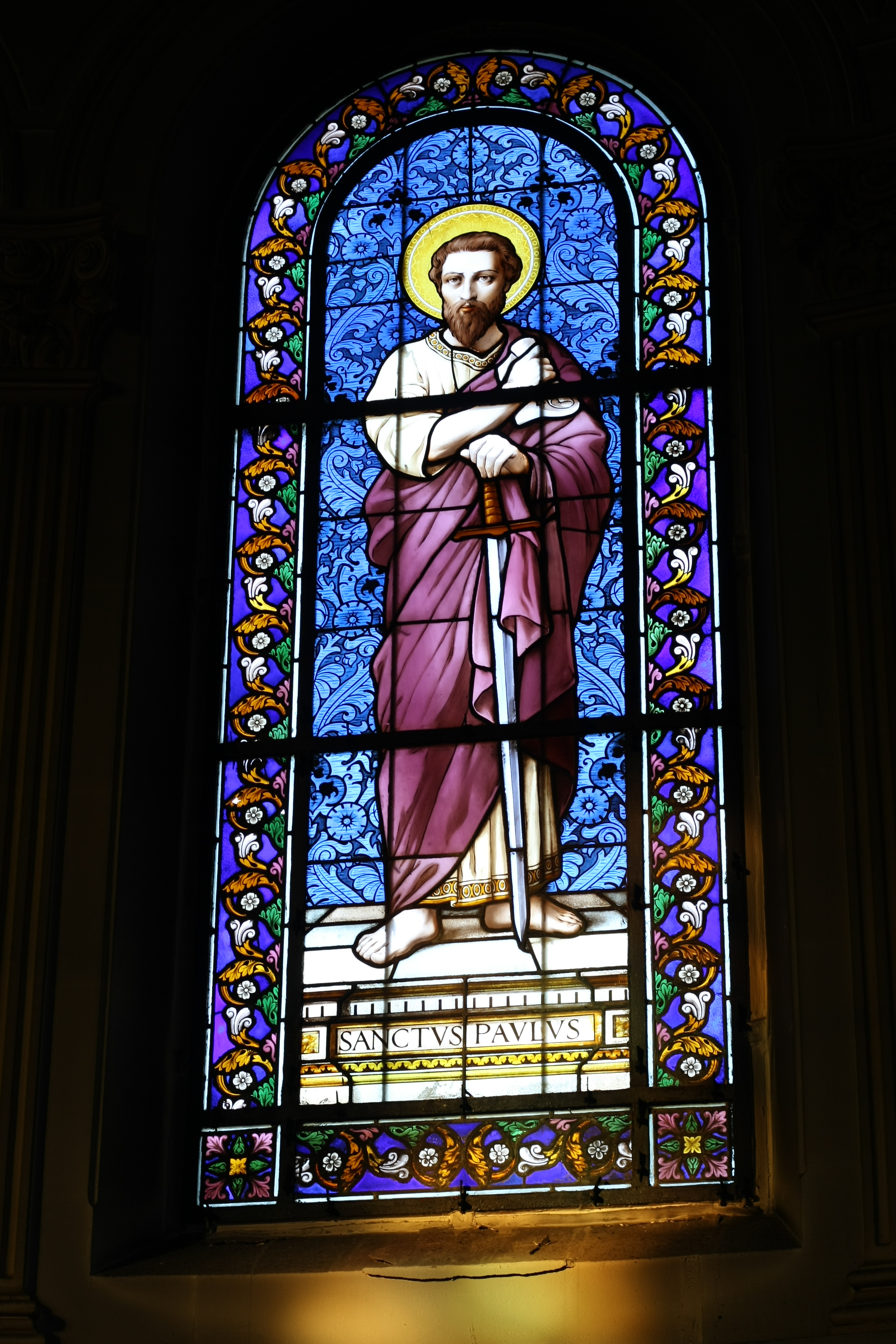
Saint Paul

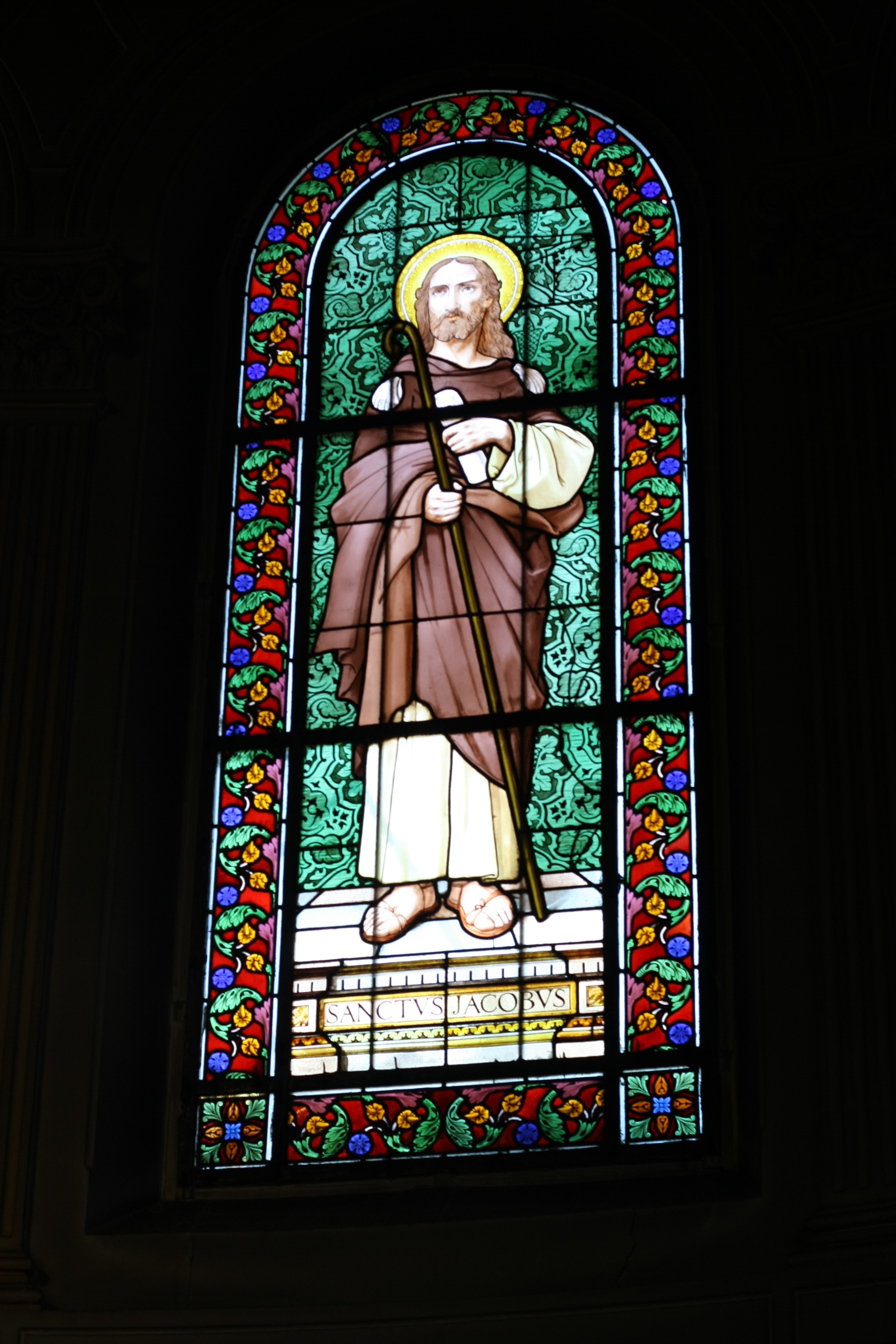
Saint Jacob

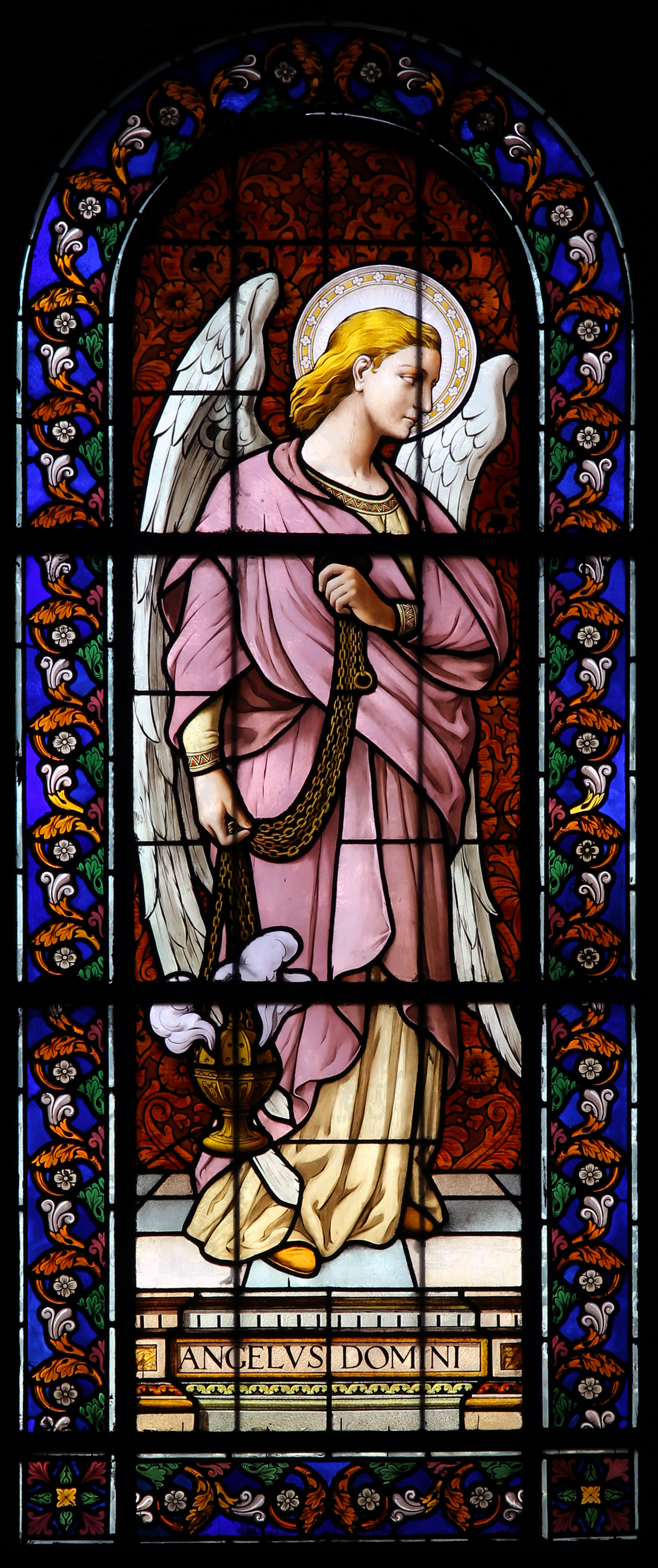
The left angel

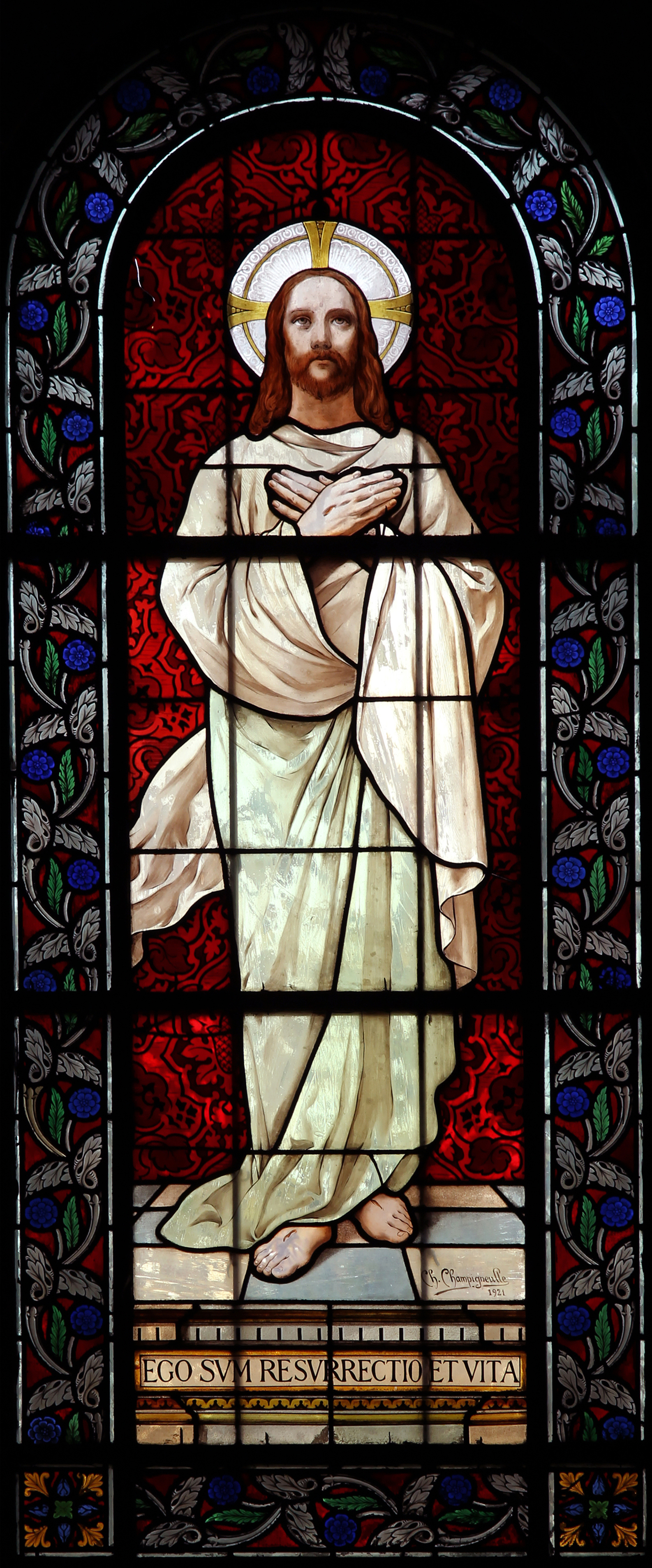
Window depicting Christ

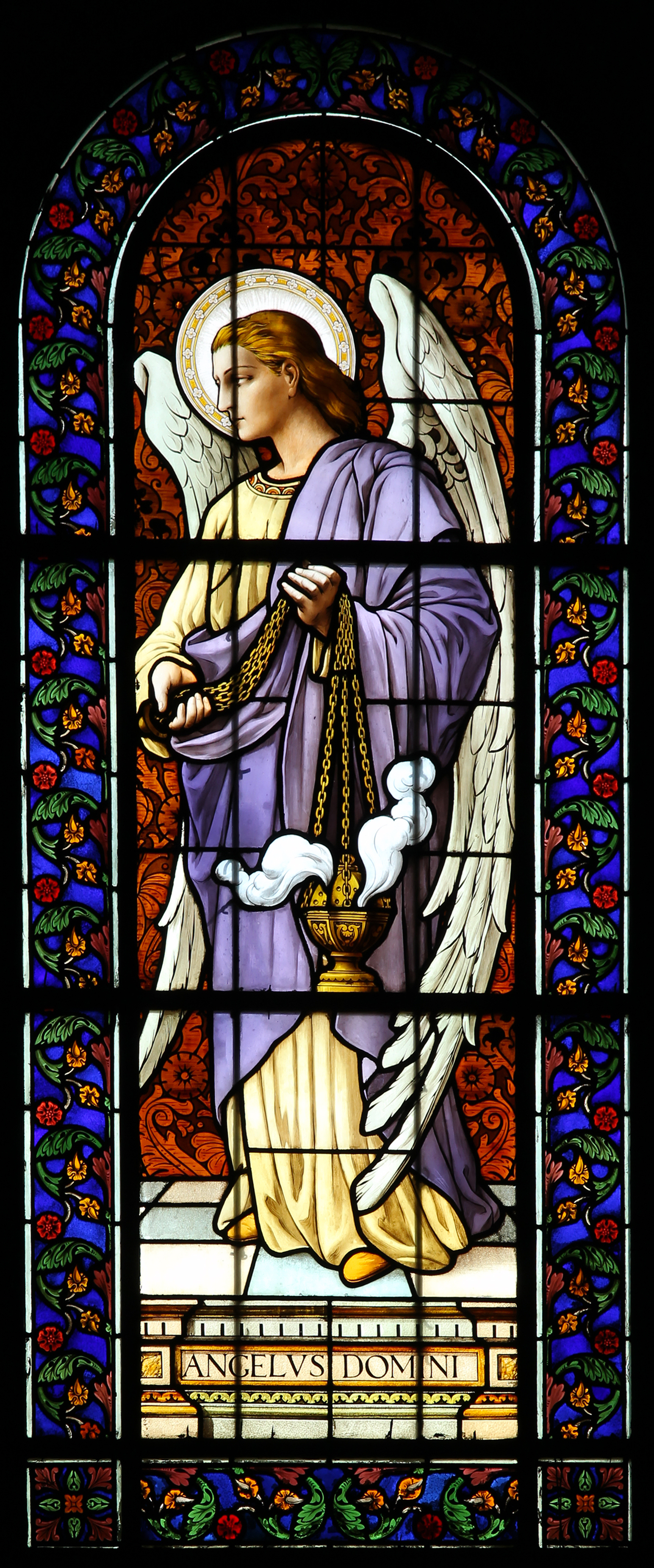
The right angel

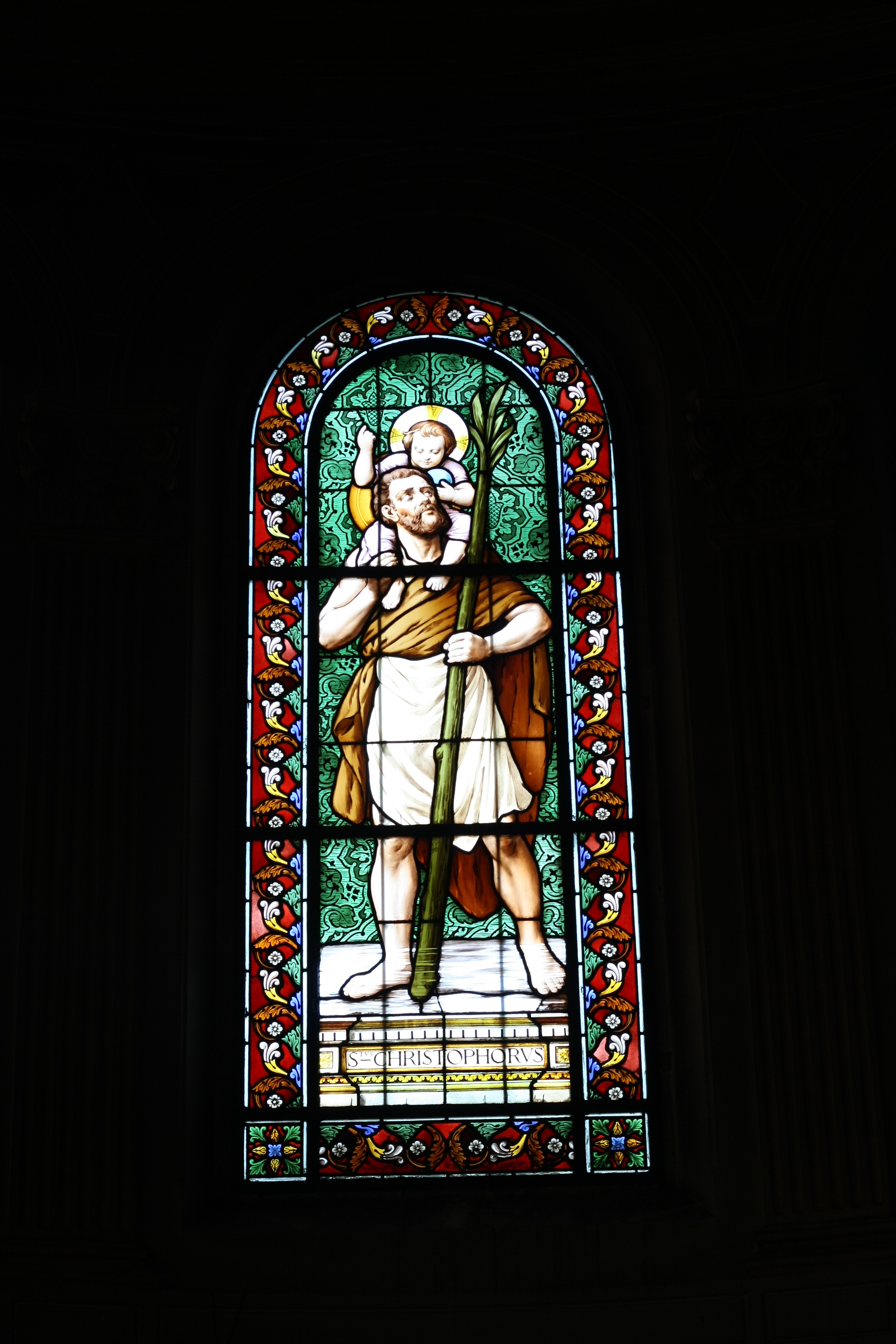
Saint Christopher
