= Église Saint-Serge, Paris =

Russian Orthodox Church in France

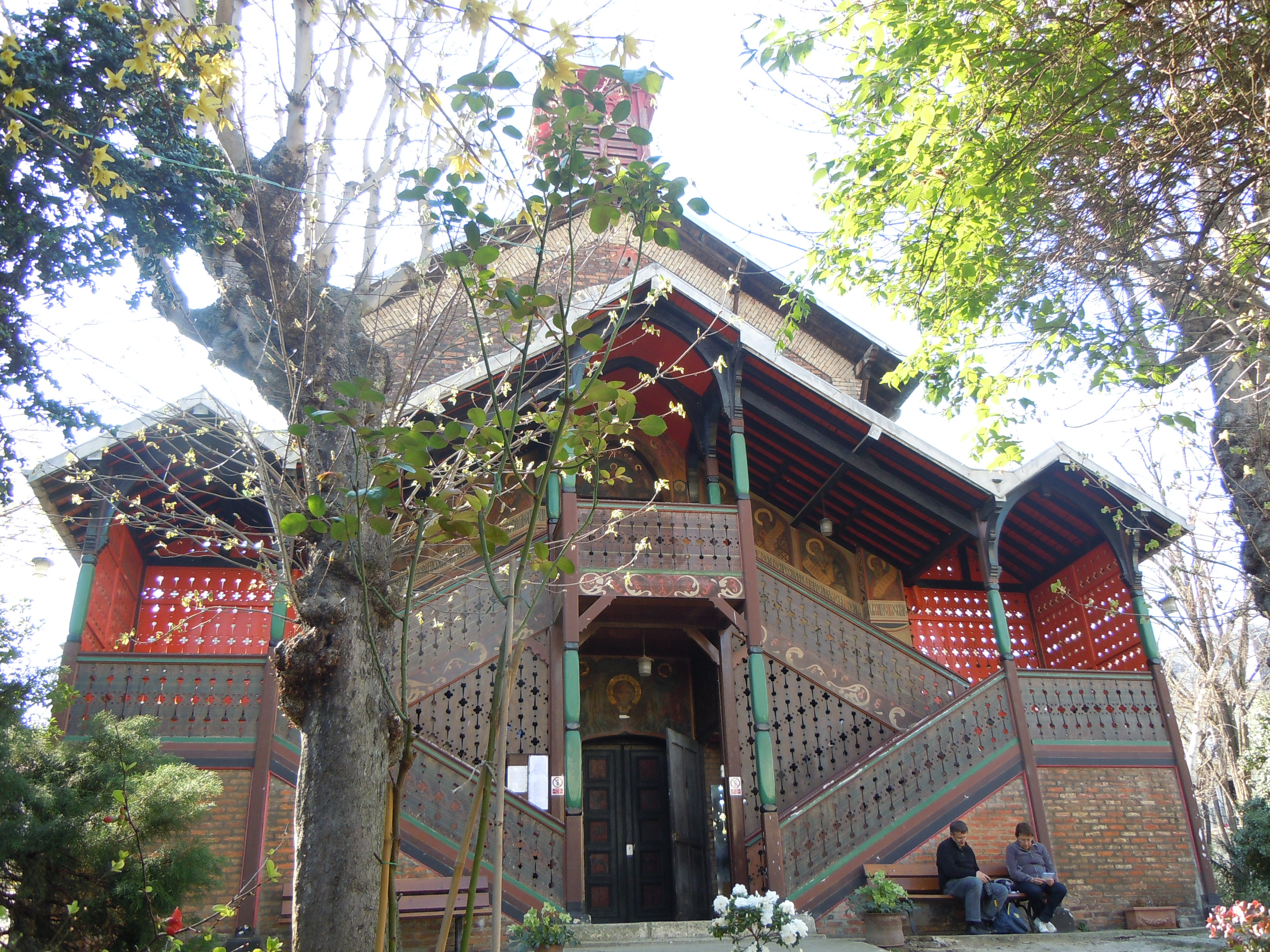

Religion
- Affiliation: Russian Orthodox Church
- Status: Active

Location
- Location: 93 Rue de Crimée, 19th arrondissement of Paris
- Interactive map of Église Saint-Serge, Paris
- Coordinates: 48°53′00″N 2°23′01″E

Architecture
- Style: 19th century Protestant and Russian Orthodox
- Groundbreaking: 1861
- Completed: 1925

The Église Saint-Serge is a parish Russian Orthodox Church located at 93 rue de Crimée in the 19th arrondissement of Paris. It was originally a Protestant church for the German community, but was requisitioned by the French government at the beginning of the First World War. After the war, in 1924, it was sold by the French government to the Russian Orthodox church, and consecrated in 1925.

The church was under the jurisdiction of the Archbishop of Orthodox of Churches of Western Tradition in Europe, headed by the Ecumenical Patriarch of Constantinople. In 2019 it was transferred to the authority of the Patriarch of the Russian Orthodox Church in Moscow. The site also is home to the Institute of Orthodox Theology, of Saint Serge.

== History ==
The chapel was built in 1861 for the German Protestant community in Paris. During the First World War, the church was taken over by the French government. After the War, the government put the chapel and adjoining structures up for sale.

Following the Russian Revolution and the Bolshevik seizure of power, a large number of Russian refugees came to Paris, overflowing the existing Alexander Nevsky Cathedral, Paris. To relieve the crowding, the chapel was purchased by the Russian Orthodox church in 1924, with the formal transition taking place on the day of the Orthodox calendar honouring Saint Serge. It was formally consecrated as an Orthodox Church on March 1, 1925.

The church took its name from Sergius of Radonezh (1313-1391), a monk born in Rostov, who founded some forty religious communities in Russia devoted to the Holy Trinity. He became a Patron Saint of Russia, and is depicted in Russian icons as a bearded monk with a halo, an "aube" or long white robe and a cape, and is often depicted carrying a rolled parchment.

After the Russian Revolution, when the Russian Orthodox Church was taken over the Soviet government, the church was moved from the authority of Moscow placed under the authority of the Archdiocese of Orthodox Churches of Russian Tradition in Western Europe, with its headquarters originally in Constantinople. After the Russian Orthodox Church was formally re-established in Russia, the church was transferred back to the authority of the Patriarch of Moscow.

== Exterior ==
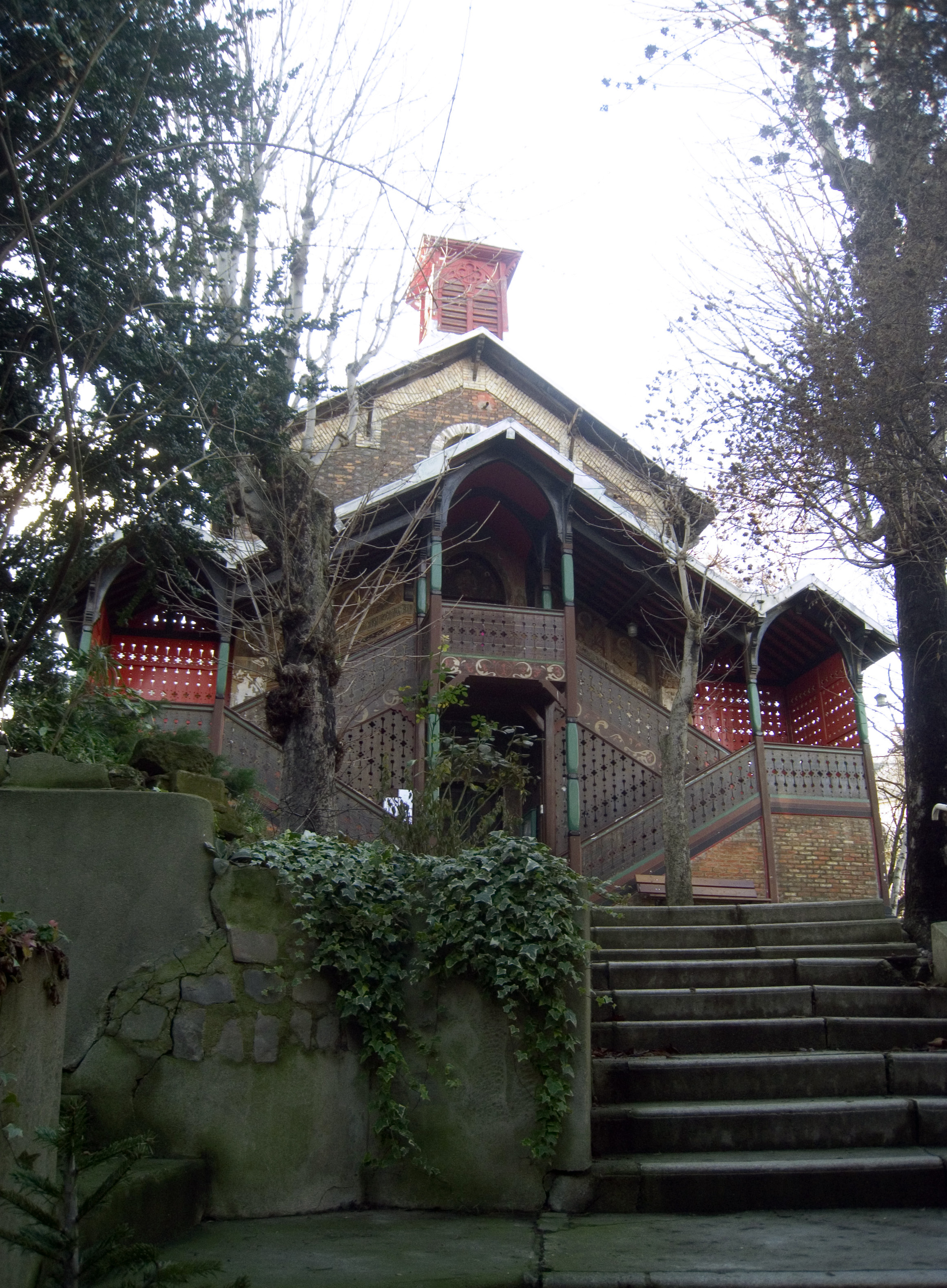
Path to the church

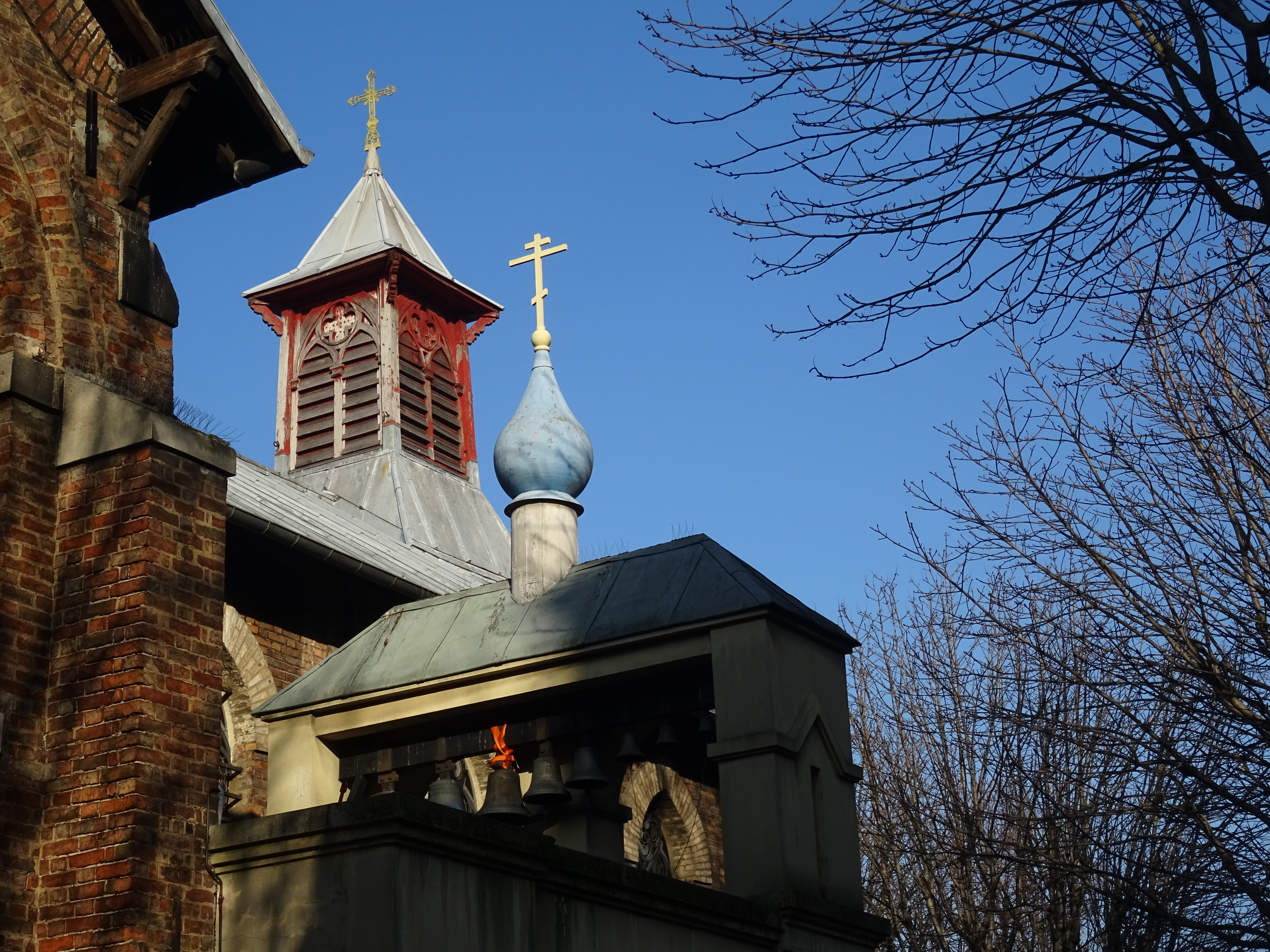
Belfry and tower

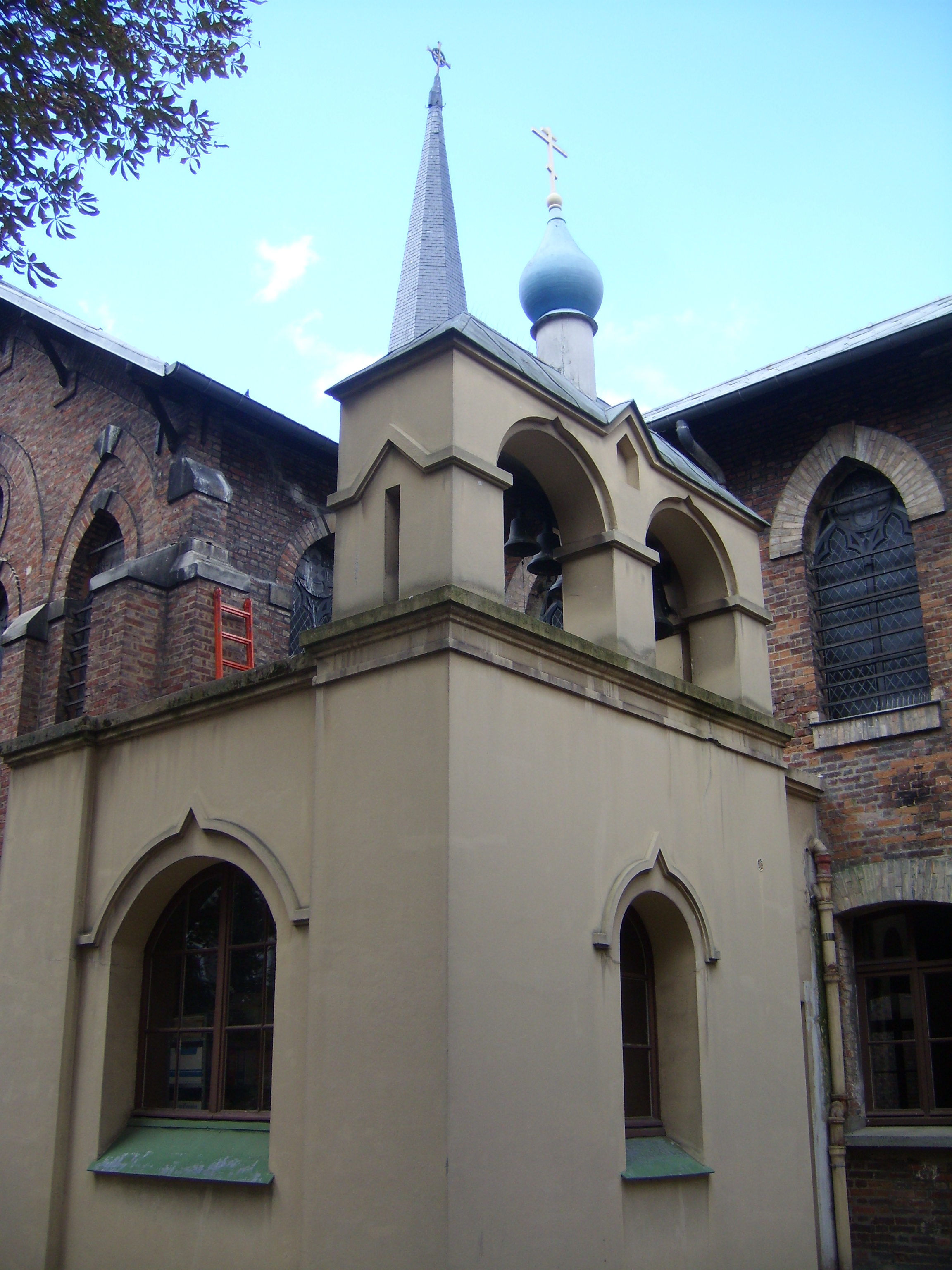
The Institute of Orthodox Theology, attached to the church

The church, on the summit of a small hill near the park of Buttes-Chaumont, is almost hidden by trees, and is accessed by a narrow lane. When the Protestant church was converted to an Orthodox Church, an elaborate new wooden entrance was constructed, with a double stairway converging at the portal on the upper floor. The exterior walls feature muralsof Russian saints, including Saint Basil the Great, Saint John Chrysostom, Saint Cyril of Alexandria, defending the Orthodox faith before the conversion of Russia to Christianity.

== Interior ==
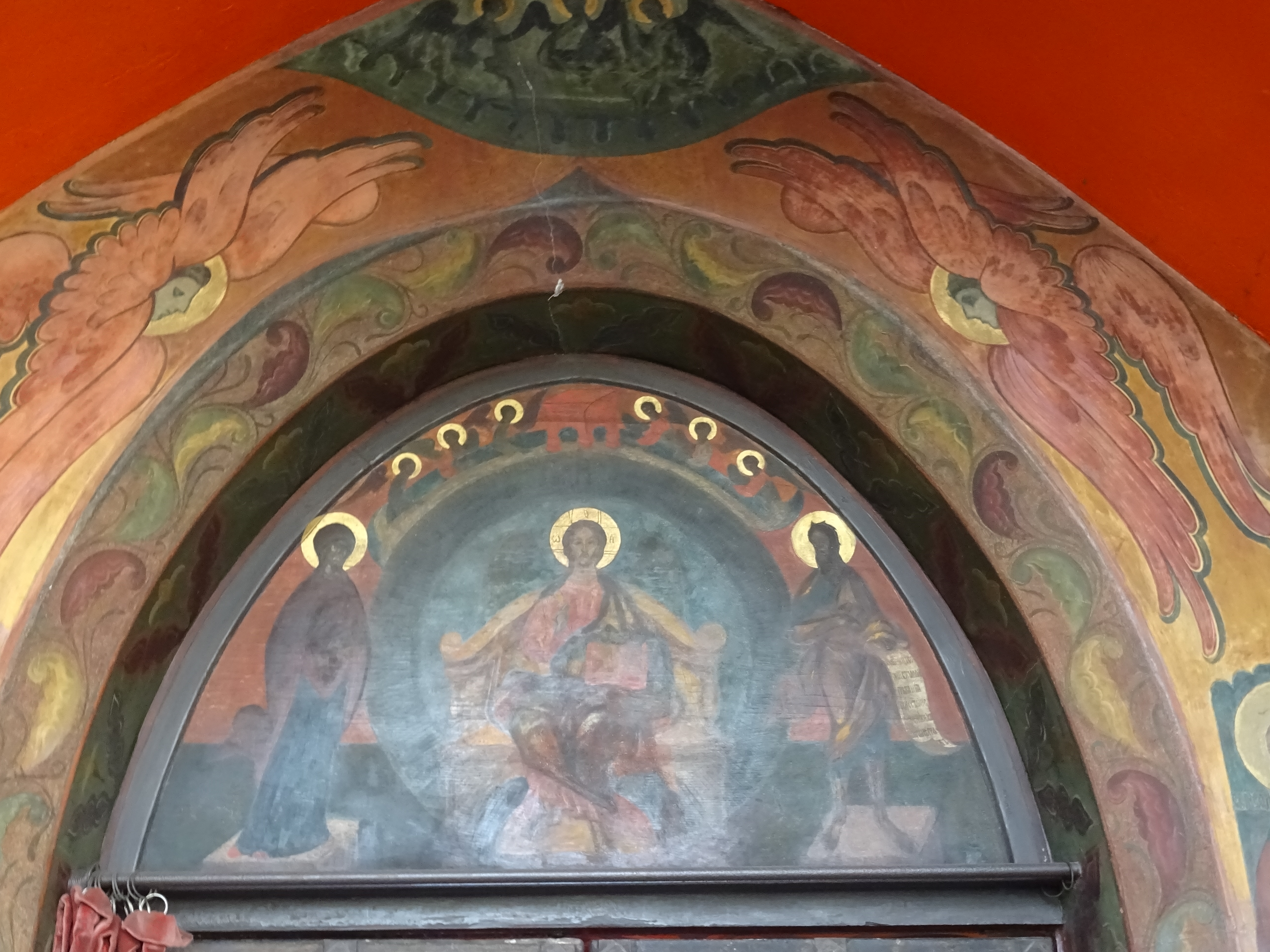
The Fronton over the portal

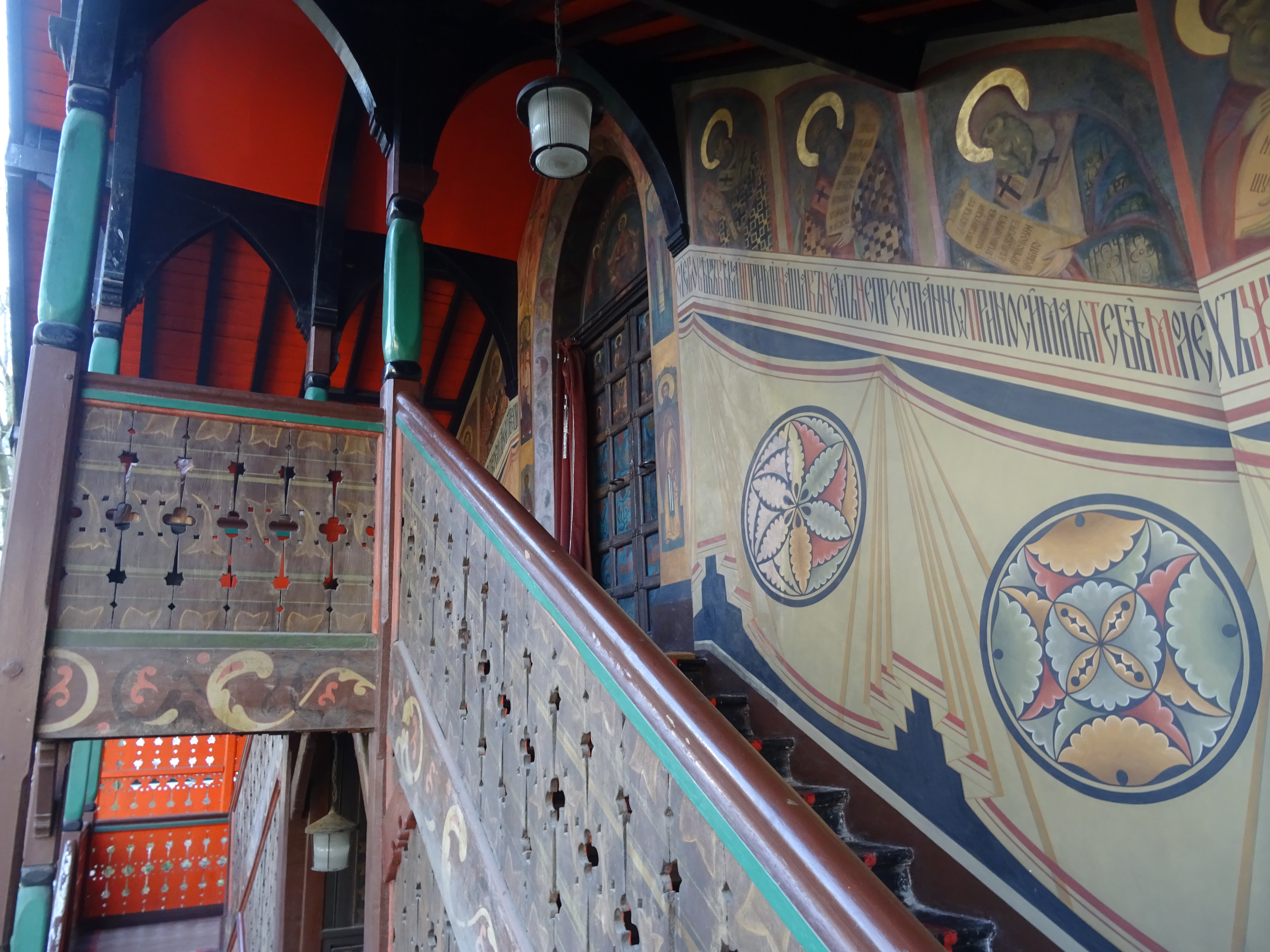
Interior of the stairway

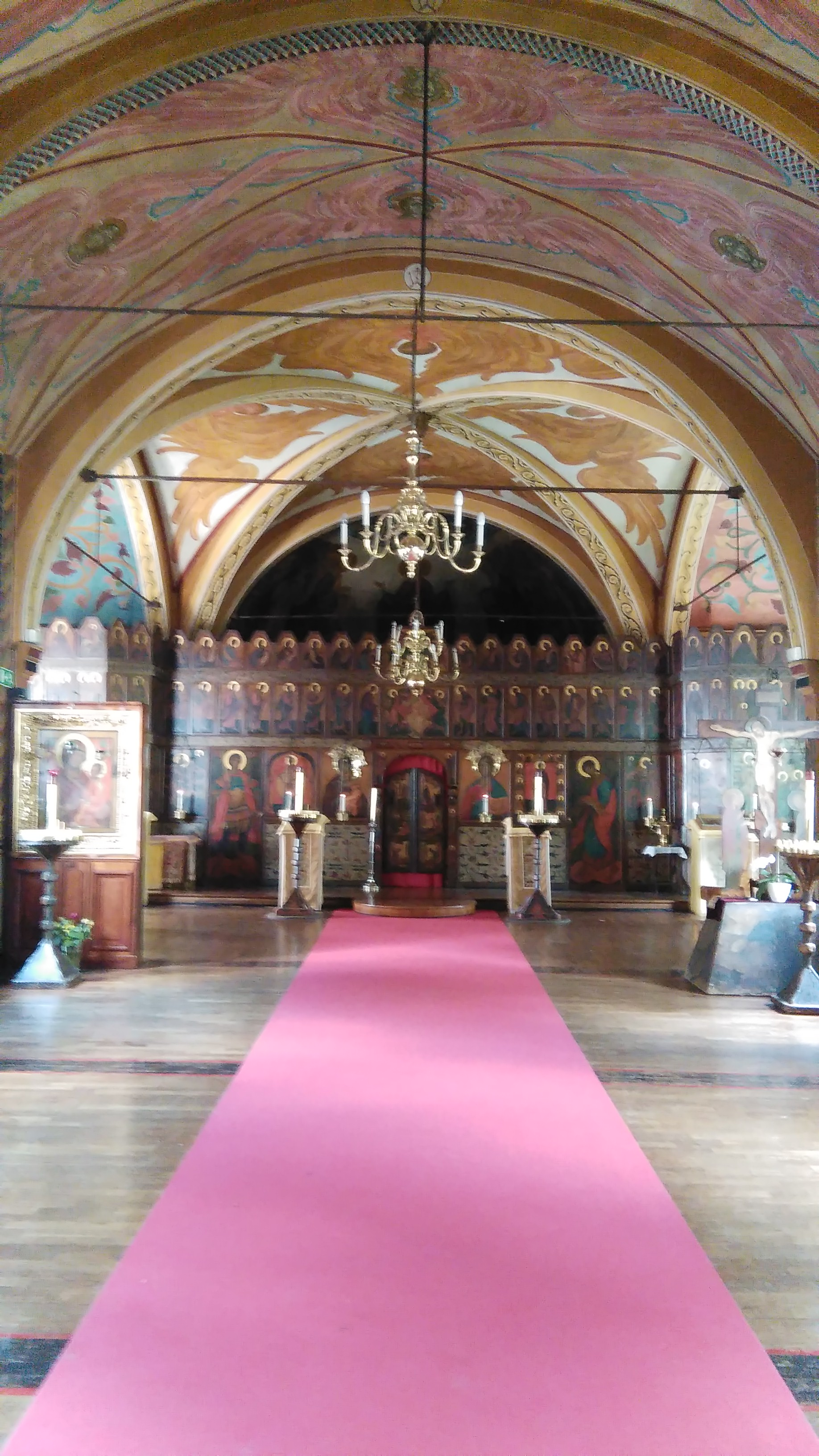
View of the interior facing the iconostasis

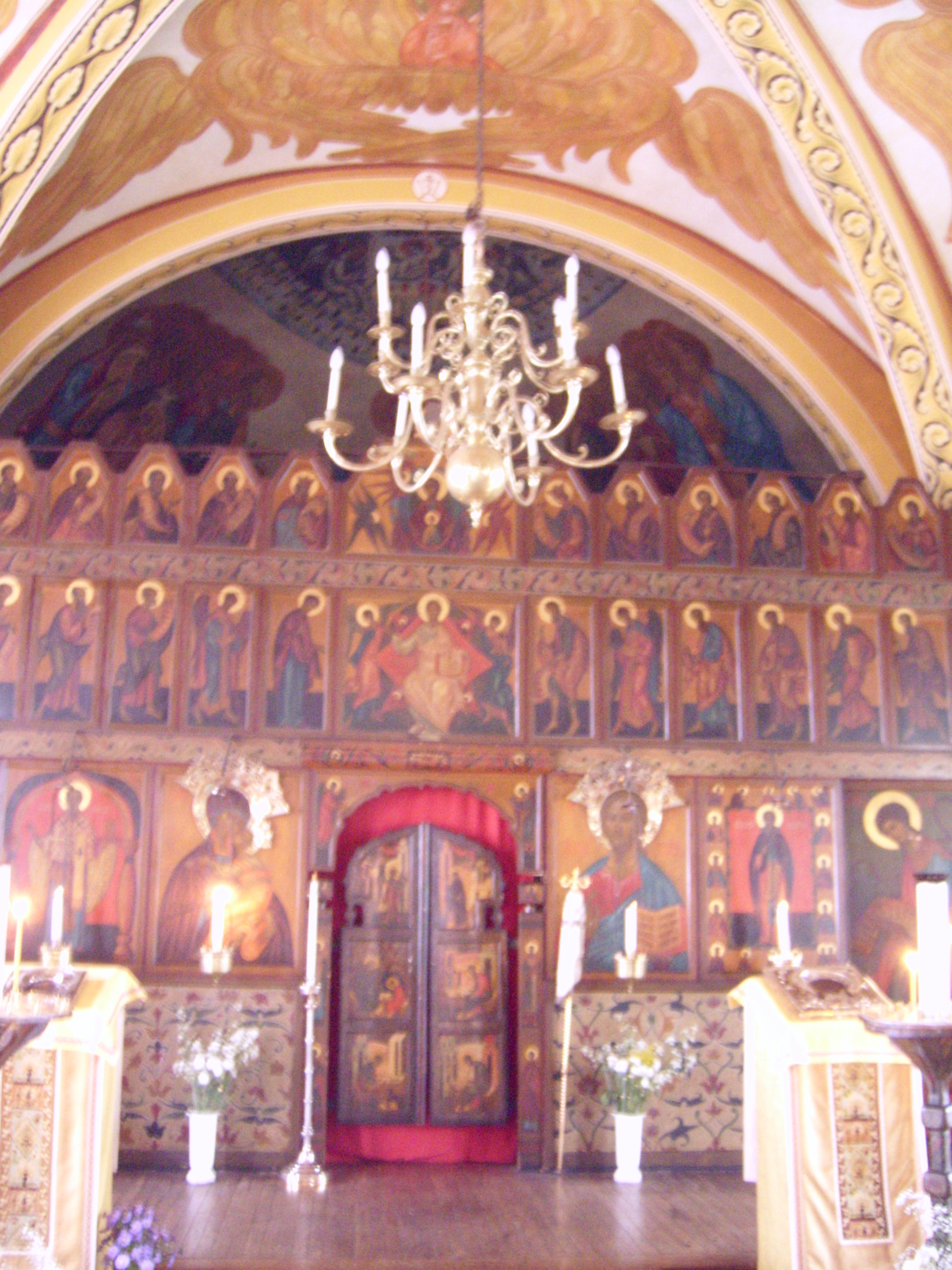
The Iconostasis, with portraits of over 100 Orthodox saints

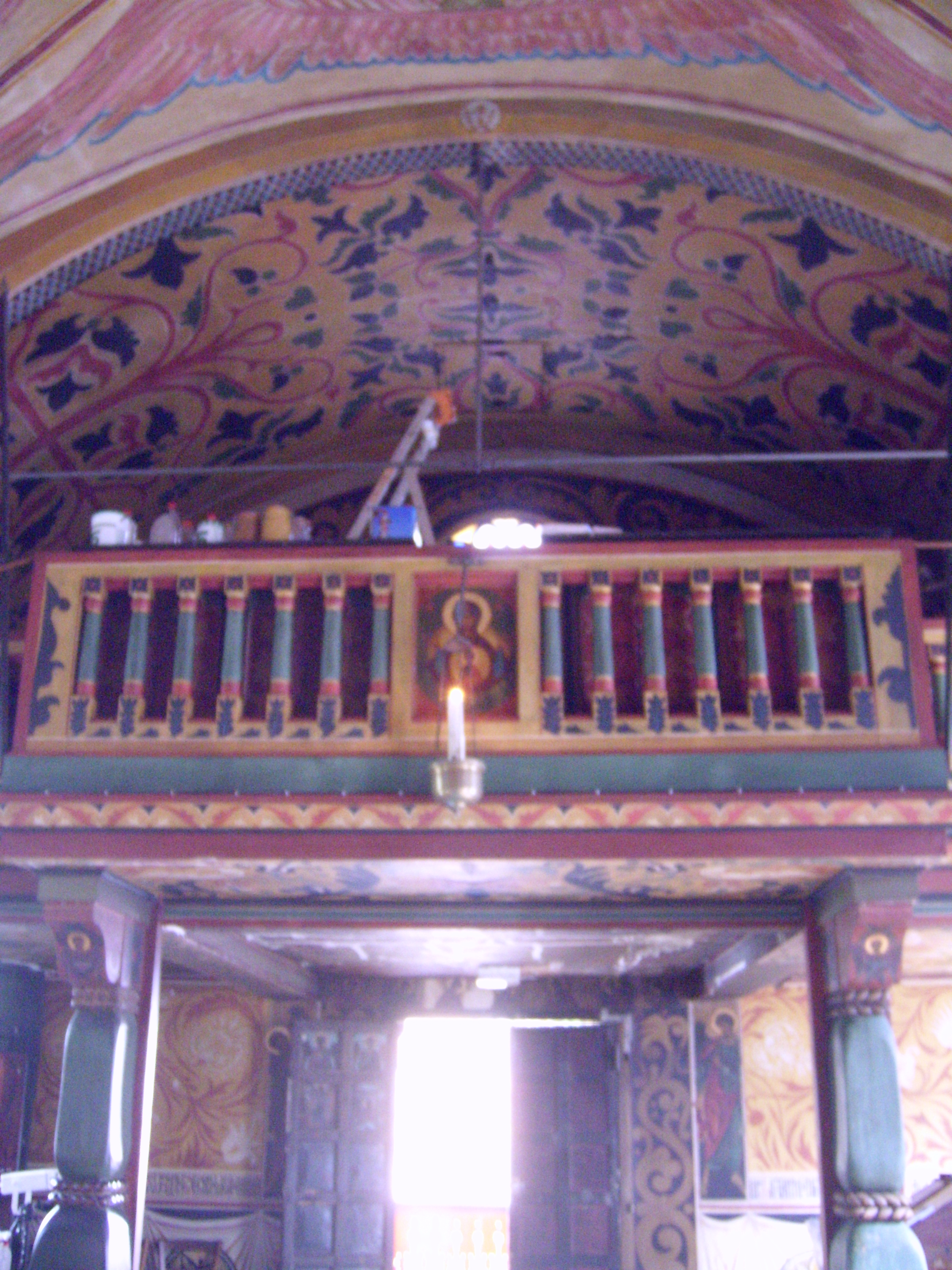
Tribune over the entrance

The interior of the sanctuary features bright colors and very elaborate art and decoration, based on traditional Orthodox churches.

The central element of the interior is the traditional wooden iconostasis, which separates the nave from the choir. Following Orthodox tradition, the iconostasis has three doorways, and has three levels with more than one hundred icons the Orthodox Saints, arranged in their traditional order of importance.

The central passage through the Iconostasis is the "Royal Doorway", reserved for the clergy. This particular doorway is an original work made in Moscow in the 16th century.

== Bibliography ==
- Dumoulin, Aline; Ardisson, Alexandra; Maingard, Jérôme; Antonello, Murielle; Églises de Paris (2010), Éditions Massin, Issy-Les-Moulineaux, ISBN 978-2-7072-0683-1 (in French)
