= Saint Francis of Assisi Church, Paris =

Coordinates: 48°52′49″N 2°23′29″E

Saint Francis of Assisi Church
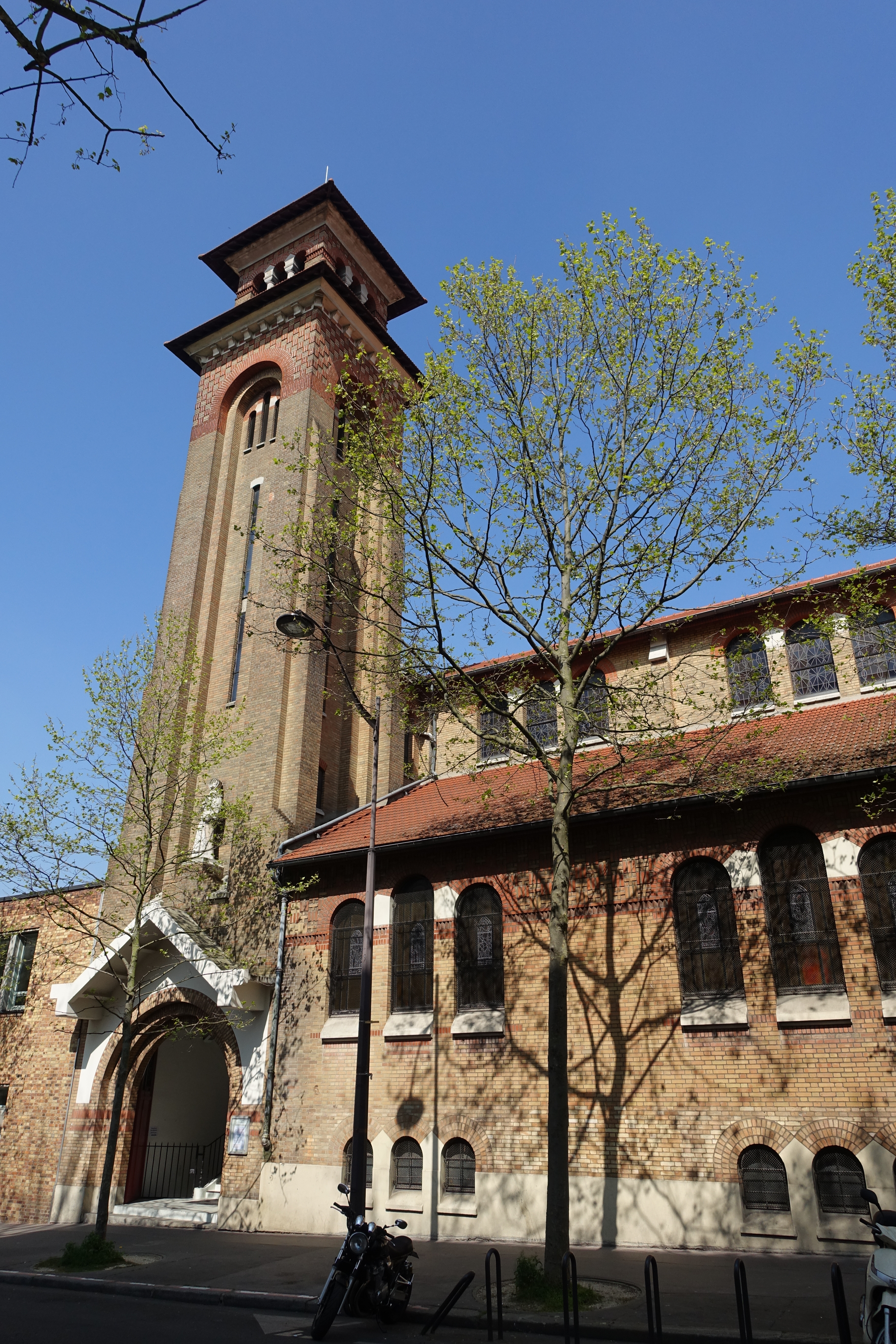
- Saint Francis of Assisi Church, Paris

Religion
- Affiliation: Catholic Church
- Province: Archdiocese of Paris
- Rite: Roman Rite

Location
- Location: Rue de Mouzaia in the 19th arrondissement of Paris
- Interactive map of Saint Francis of Assisi Church

Architecture
- Style: Neo-Romanesque
- Groundbreaking: 1914
- Completed: 1926

Saint Francis of Assisi Church is a Roman Catholic church located on Rue de Mouzaia in the 19th arrondissement of Paris. It was built between 1914 and 1926, with an interruption caused by the First World War. It was dedicated to Saint Francis of Assisi to commemorate the 700th anniversary of the Third Order of Saint Francis, founded in 1222.

== History ==
At the site the church there was a simple crypt, but as the population grew the quarter needed its own church. The church was built by two architect brothers, Paul Courcoux and Augustin Courcoux ((1871–1956)] the latter completed the project after the death of his brother. It was constructed of reinforced concrete, in a Neo-Italian-Romanesque style.

The exterior was largely inspired by the churches of the Italian province of Umbria, where Saint Francis lived, and also he home of Saint Clair, the founder of the Order of the Clarisses. The architecture is ver sober, with little ornament, but th4 interior is brightened by colourful stained glass windows, mosaics and paintings.

== Interior ==
The nave is separated from then outer aisle by arcades of columns with rounded arches. The ceiling is made of cement, which imitates the wooden ceilings of earlier churches, then whiteness of the arcades and walls makes a stark contrast with the black and brown "wooden" colour of the ceiling,

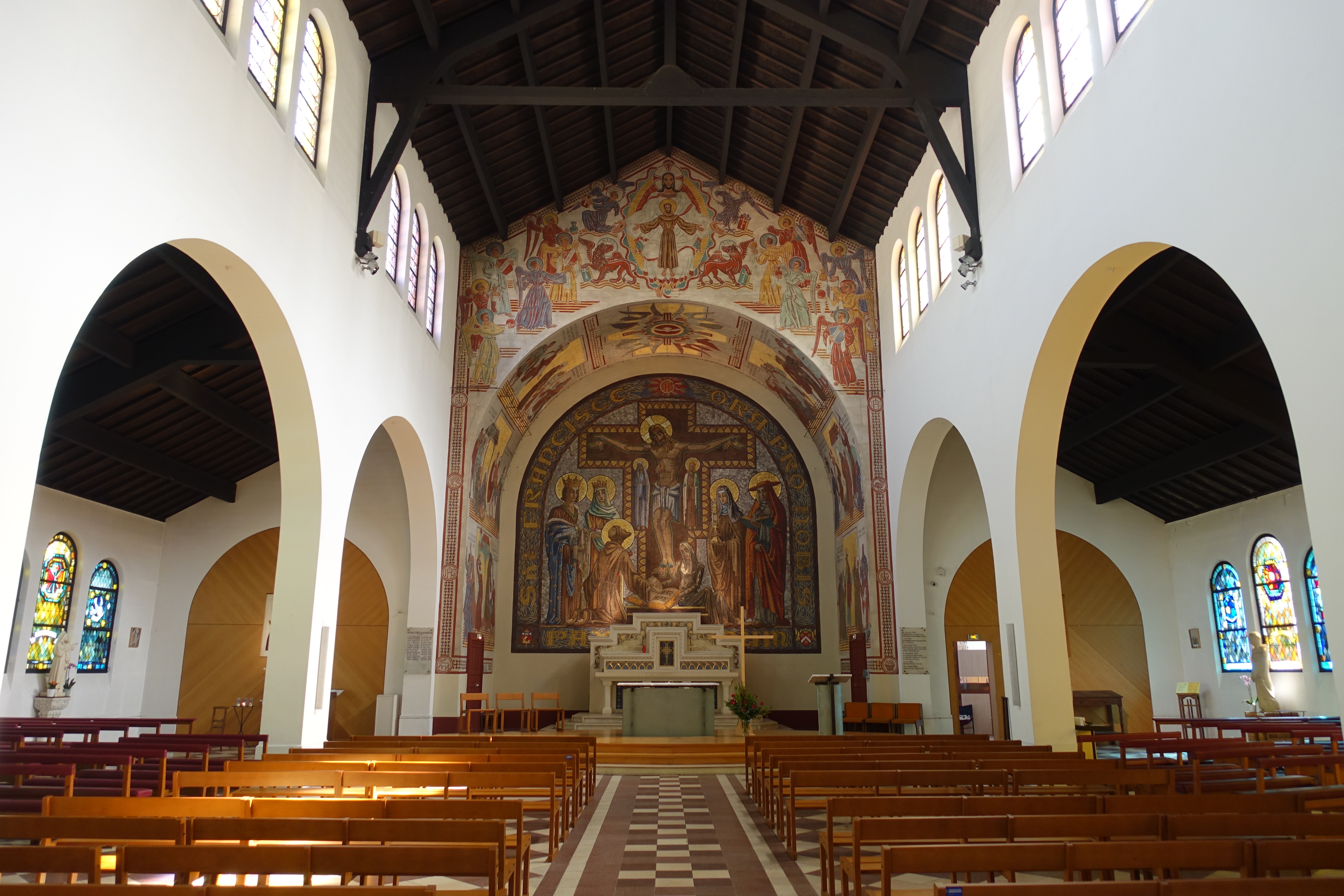
The nave facing the choir

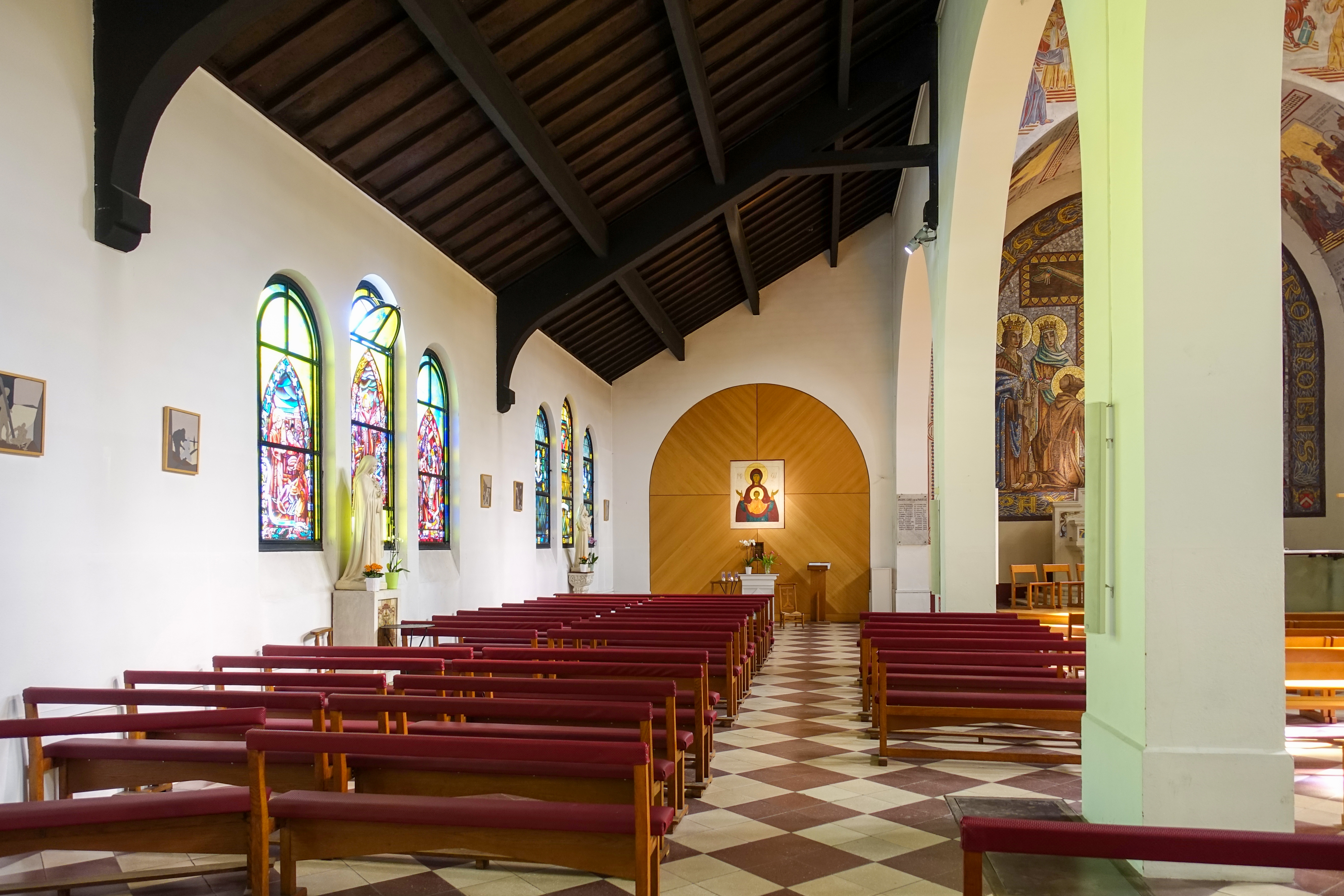
Side aisle and chapel

=== The Choir ===
The Choir is the only part of the church that is richly decorated. Its central feature is a large mosaic in the Byzantine style on the flat chevet. It depicts Christ on the cross. Around him are the Virgin Mary and the Apostle Jhn. At his feet are Saint Francis, receiving the stigmata, Near him is a woman in black, illustrating the mission of the Franciscans to aid the poor. Other figures illustrate other figures venerated by the Franciscans; Saint Claire and Saint Bonaventure (right) and Saint Louis and Saint Elisabeth of Hungary (right) The mosaics were made by the Maison Maumejean.

The main altars made of stone decorated with mosaics. The sides of the tabernacle are decorated with mosaics of peacocks, the symbols of the Resurrection.

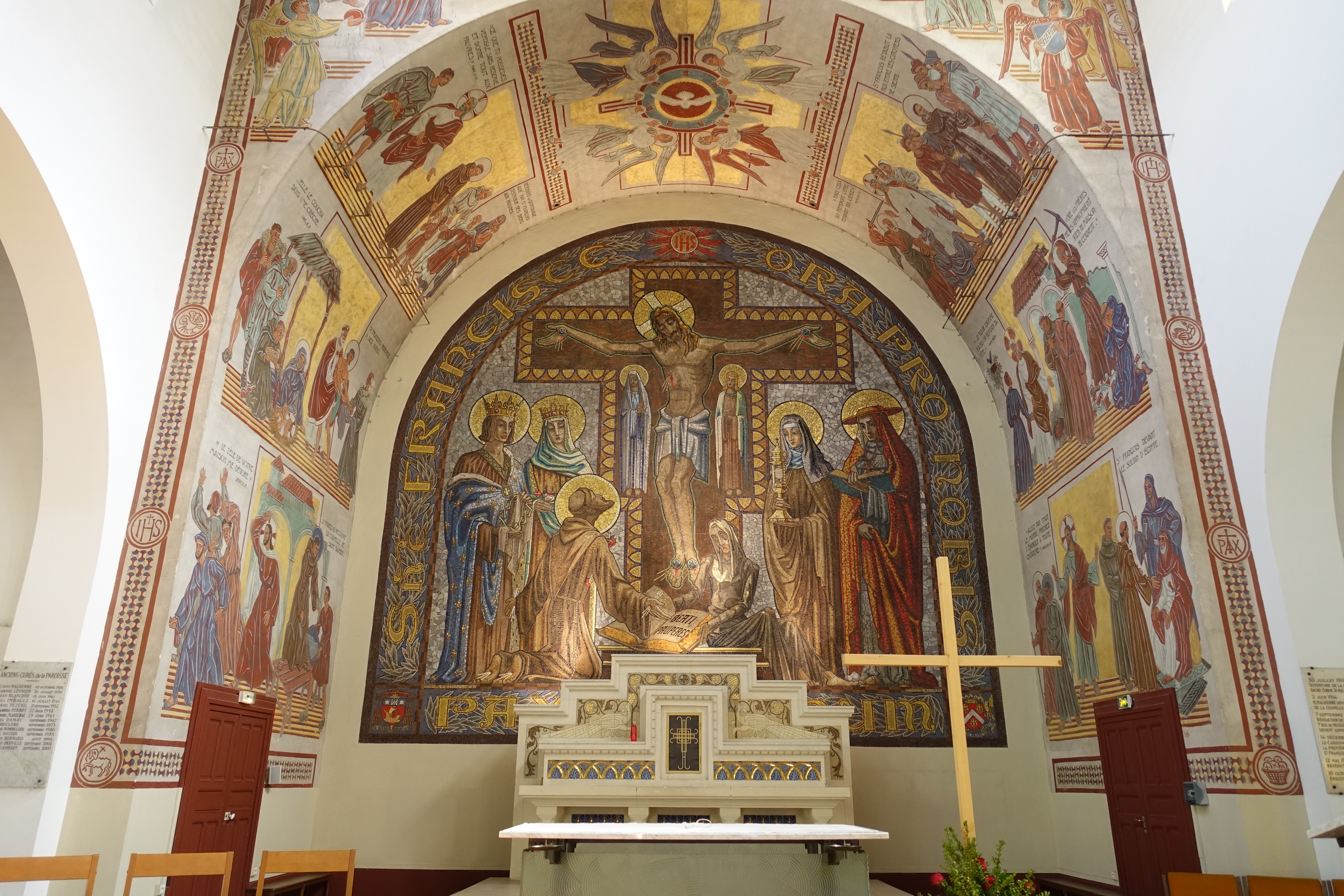
Tke altar and Neo-Byzantine mosaics

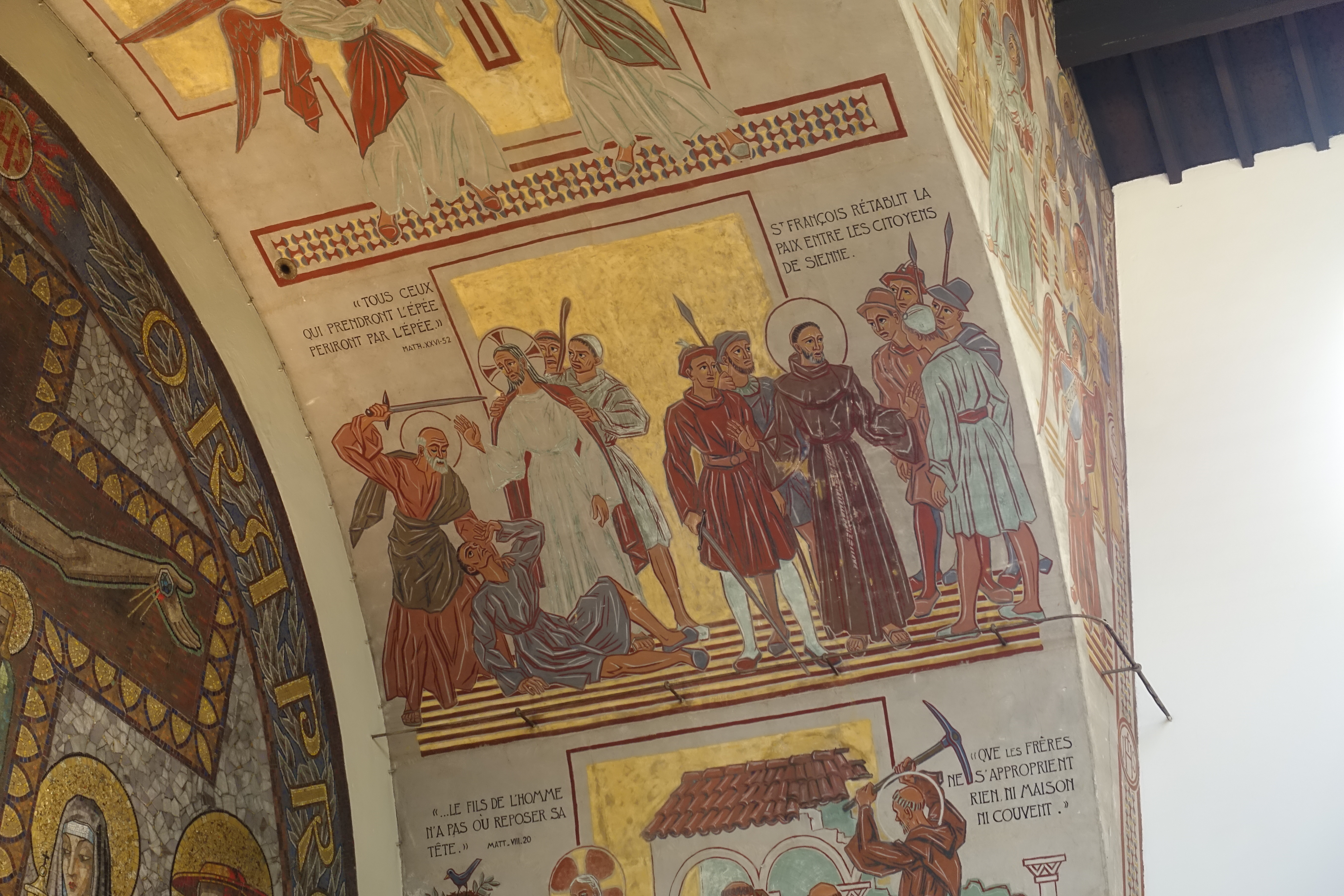
Mosaics in the choir

== Stained Glass ==
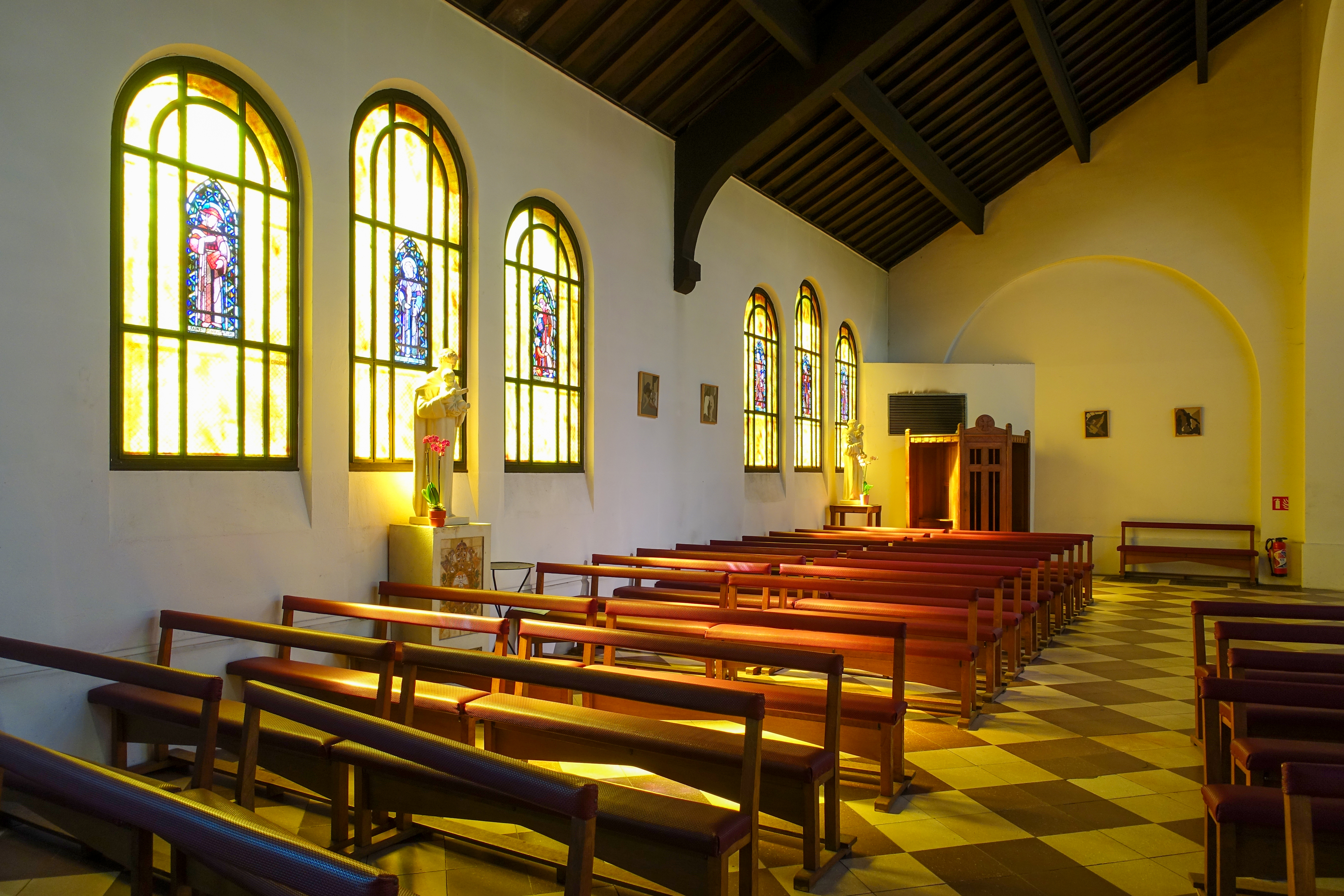

Three angels in adoration

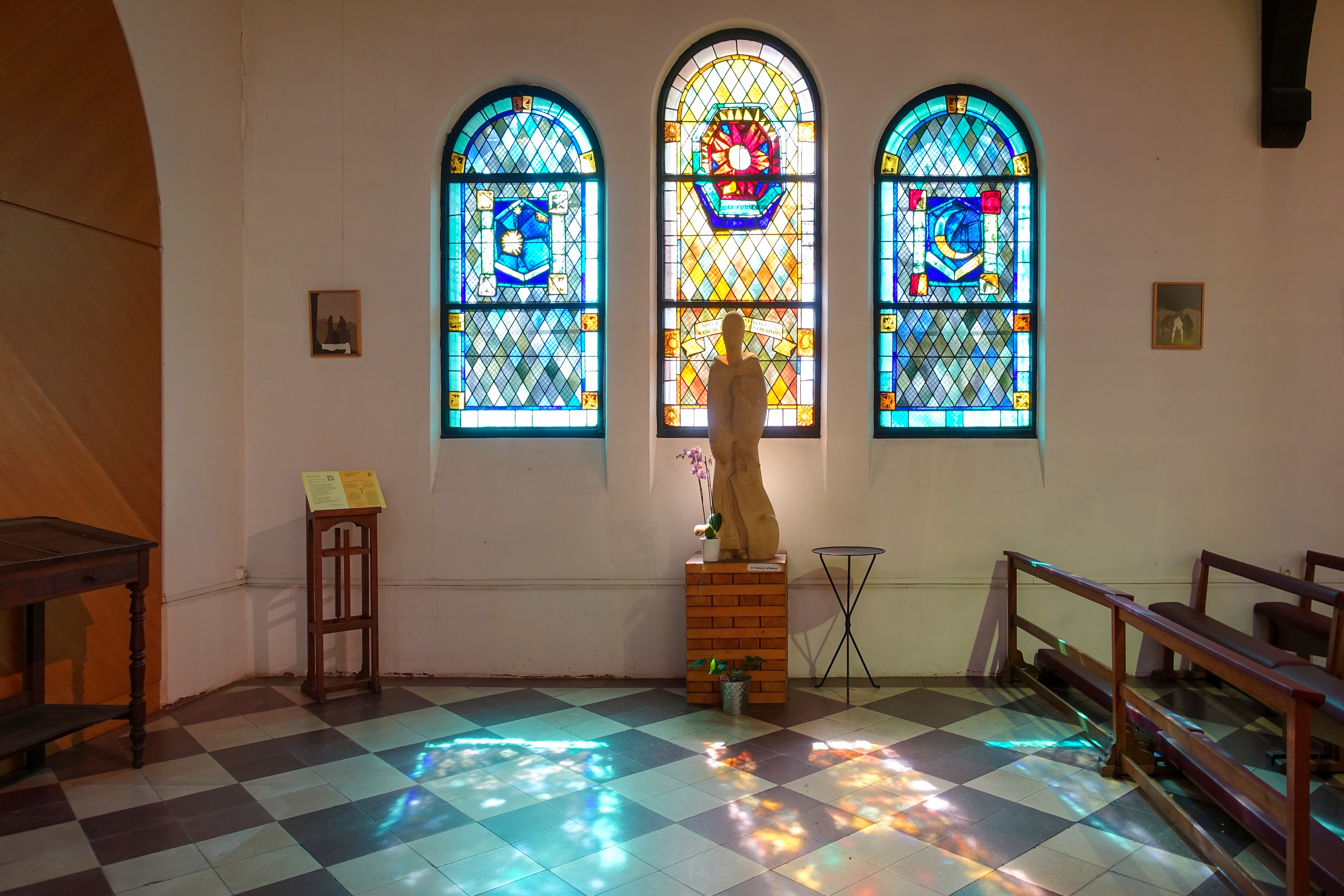
Chapel windows, left to right, "The stars","The sun" and "The moon". Statue is the Virgin Mary

The windows of the upper church are largely clear, to provide a maximum of light to the interior. The chapels and outer aisles are decorated with pictorial windows of Saints.

== The Organ ==
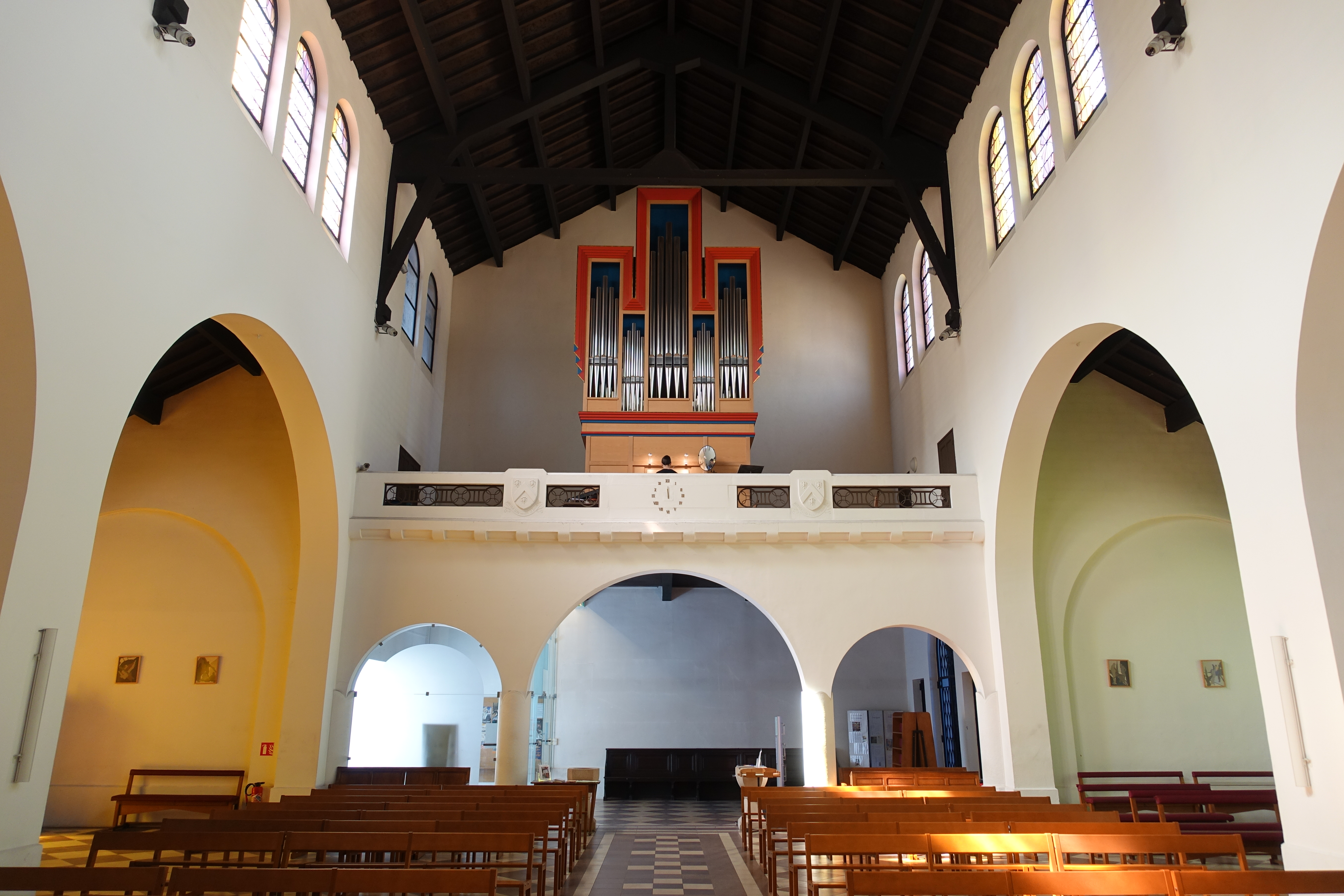
The organ in the tribune

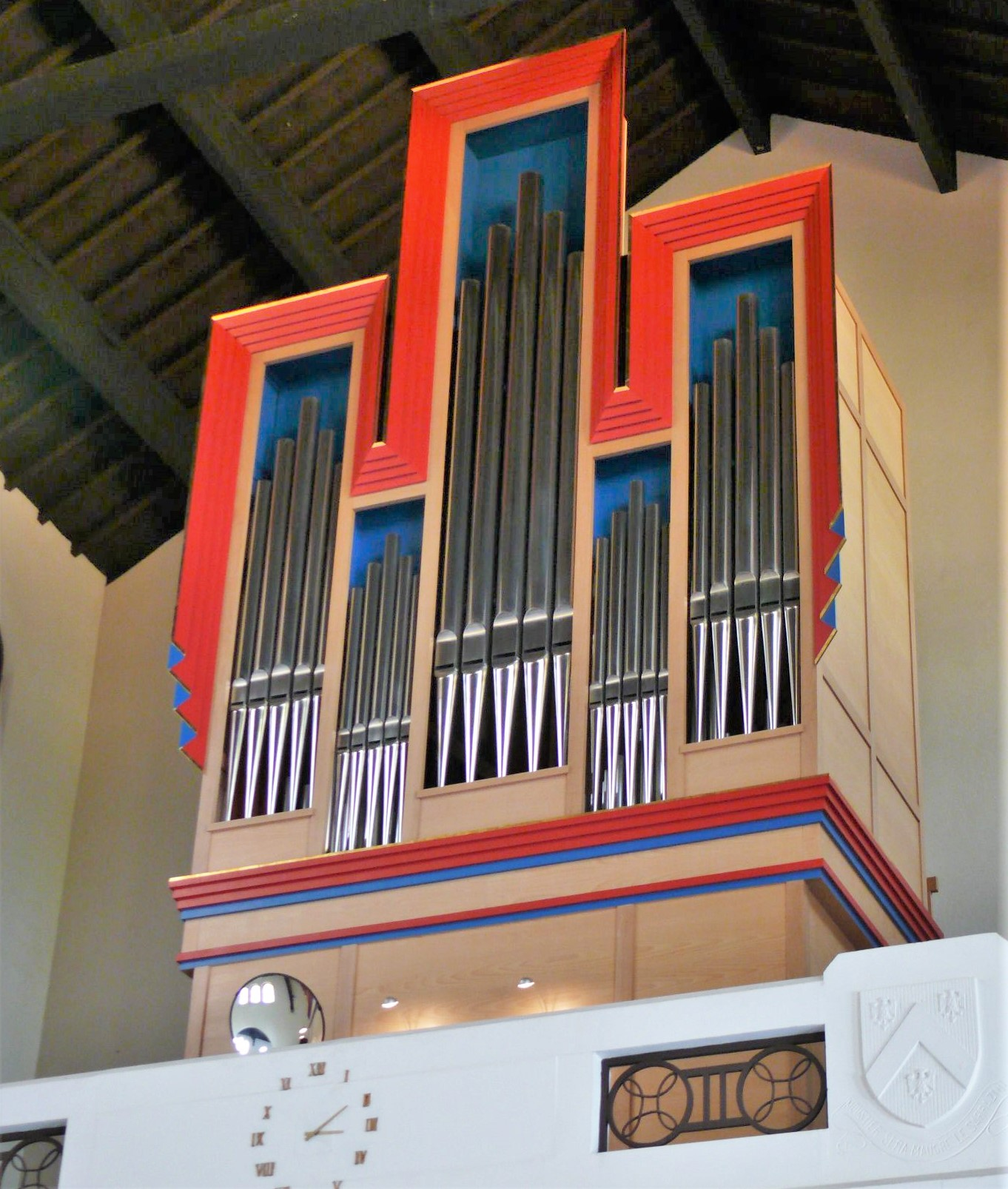
Close-up of the organ

The organ is placed in the tribune over the portal. It is a modern instrument, made by Bernard Cogez in 2007.

== External Sources (In French) ==
- Paeish websitel
- Église Saint-François-d'Assise, Art, Culture & Foi site
- Paris, église Saint-François-d'Assise, 19^{e} arrondissement, Patrimoine-Histoire site
