= 19th arrondissement of Paris =

- Municipal arrondissement
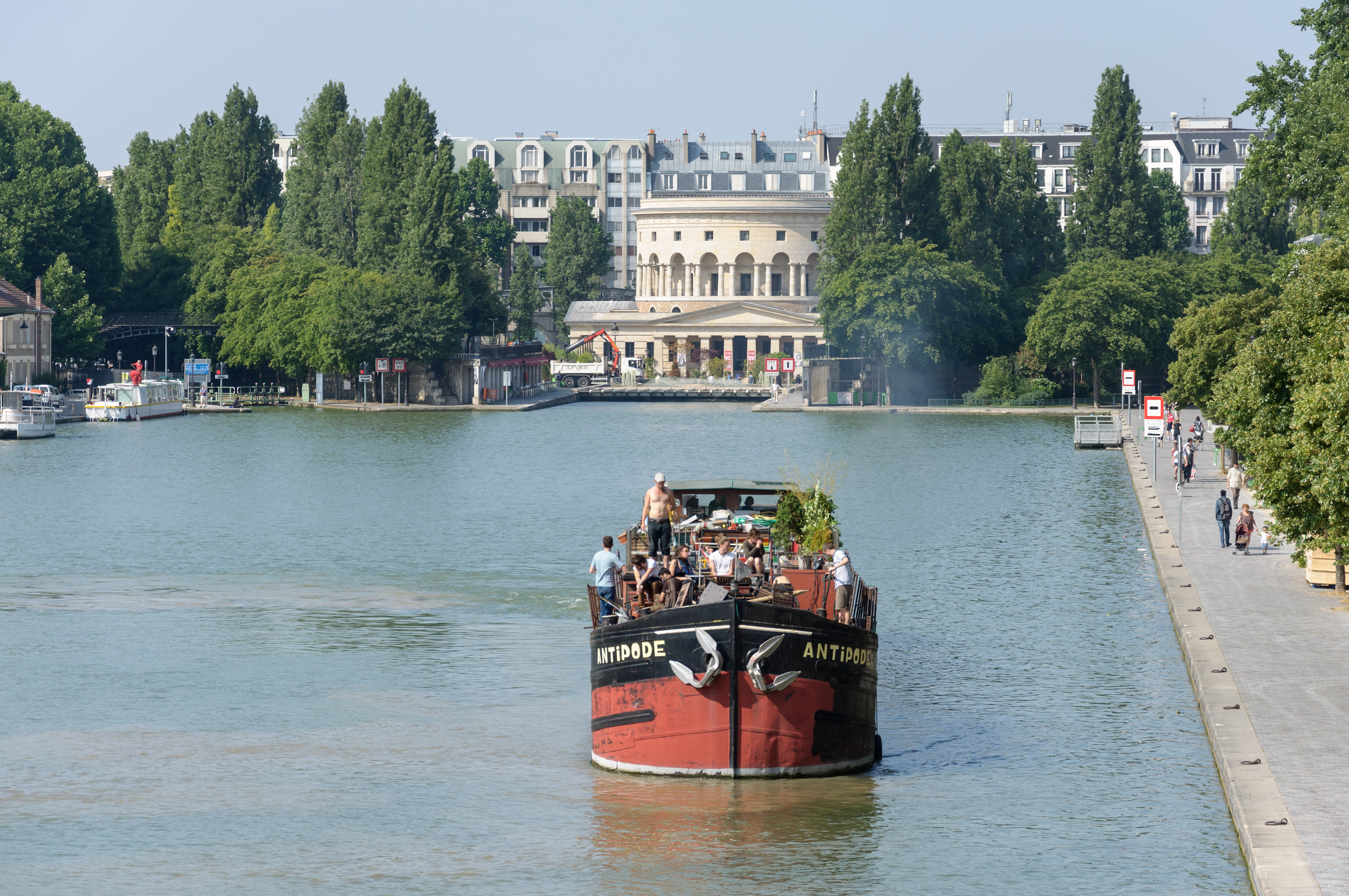
- La Villette

- Coat of arms

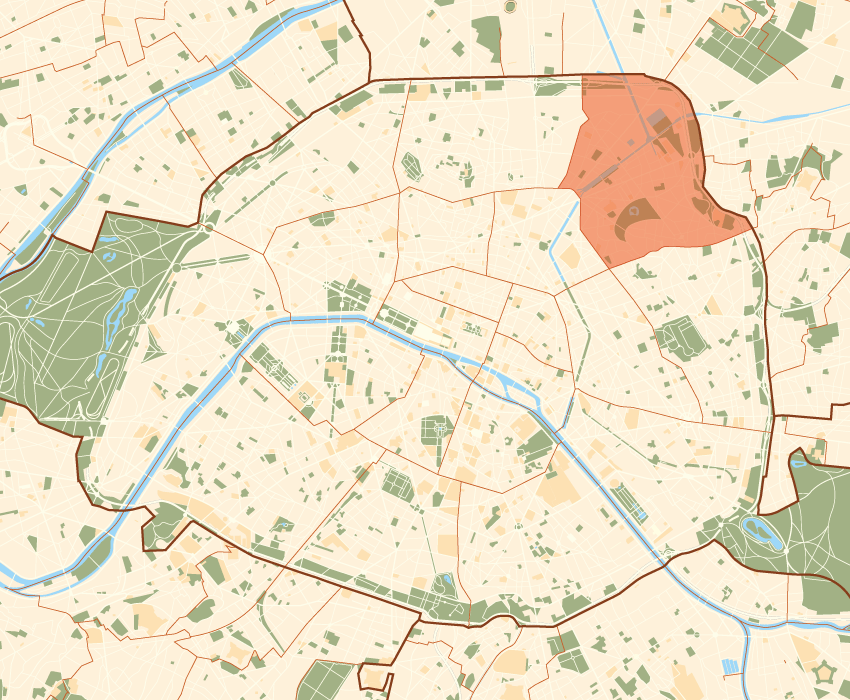
- Location within Paris
- Coordinates: 48°52′56″N 2°22′55″E
- Country: France
- Region: Île-de-France
- Department: Paris
- Commune: Paris

Government
  - Mayor (2020–2026): François Dagnaud (PS)
- Area: 6.79 km^{2} (2.62 sq mi)
- Population (2023): 178,691
  - Density: 26,300/km^{2} (68,200/sq mi)
- INSEE code: 75119

The 19th arrondissement of Paris (XIX^{e} arrondissement) is one of the 20 arrondissements of the capital city of France. In spoken French, this arrondissement is referred to as dix-neuvième. In 2023, it had a population of 178,691.

The arrondissement, known as Butte-Chaumont, is situated on the right bank of the River Seine. It is crossed by two canals, the Canal Saint-Denis and the Canal de l'Ourcq, which meet near the Parc de la Villette.

The 19th arrondissement, mixing the Old French bohemianism and also the Parisian cosmopolitanism, includes two public parks: the Parc des Buttes Chaumont, located on a hill, and the Parc de la Villette, which is home to the Cité des Sciences et de l'Industrie, a museum and exhibition center; the Conservatoire de Paris, one of the most renowned music schools in Europe; the Cabaret Sauvage; and the Zénith de Paris and the Philharmonie de Paris, both part of the Cité de la Musique.

== Geography ==
The quarters of the 19th arrondissement

The land area of the arrondissement is 6.786 km^{2} (2.620 sq mi).

The arrondissement consists of four quarters:

- Quartier Villette (73)
- Quartier Pont-de-Flandre (74)
- Quartier Amérique (75)
- Quartier Combat (76)

== Demographics ==
The population of the 19th arrondissement has been constantly increasing from 1975 until 2017. 68,101 people worked in the arrondissement in 1999.

This sector has become the home for many immigrants to France, particularly from North Africa.

Historical population

Year	Pop.	±% p.a.
1861	76,445	—
1872	93,174	+1.82%
1881	119,231	+2.78%
1891	128,388	+0.74%
1901	144,953	+1.22%
1911	155,864	+0.73%
1921	156,243	+0.02%
1931	165,757	+0.59%
1936	163,094	−0.32%
1946	149,297	−0.88%
1954	155,028	+0.47%

Year	Pop.	±% p.a.
1962	159,568	+0.36%
1968	148,862	−1.15%
1975	144,357	−0.44%
1982	162,649	+1.72%
1990	165,062	+0.18%
1999	172,730	+0.51%
2007	184,038	+0.80%
2012	186,116	+0.22%
2017	187,015	+0.10%
2023	178,691	−0.76%

Source: Demographia (1861-1999) and INSEE (1876-2023)

== Transportation ==
The 19th arrondissement is served by Paris Metro Line 2, Line 5, Line 7, Line 7bis, Line 11 and tramway line 3b.

== Places of interest ==
- Parc des Buttes Chaumont
- Parc de la Villette
- Parc de la Butte-du-Chapeau-Rouge
- The Cent Quatre arts centre
- Église Saint-Serge, Paris, Russian Orthodox church
- Saint Francis of Assisi Church, Paris
- Saint-Jacques-Saint-Christophe de la Villette
- ESLSCA

== Notable people ==
- Kylian Mbappé, professional footballer
- Ethan Mbappé, professional footballer
