= Embassy of France, Bujumbura =

- Logo of the embassy
- Location: Bujumbura
- Address: 60, Uprona Boulevard
- Coordinates: 3.381042°S 29.370135°E
- Ambassador: Sébastien Minot
- Website: bi.diplomatie.gouv.fr

The Embassy of France in Burundi is the diplomatic mission of France to Burundi. It is located in Bujumbura, the former political and current economic capital of the country, and since 2024 its ambassador has been Sébastien Minot.

== Embassy ==
The embassy is located in Bujumbura. It also has a consulate.

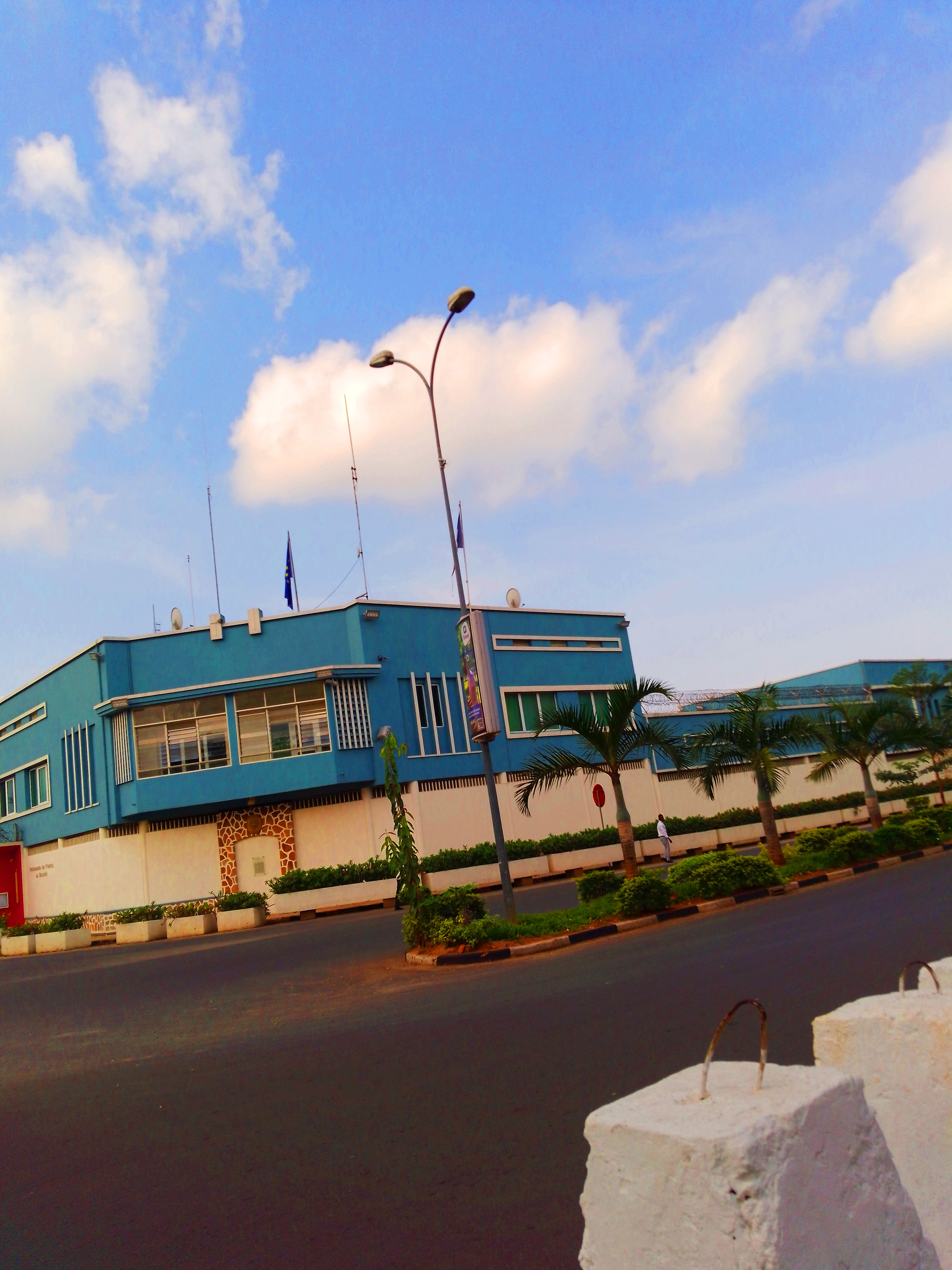
Picture of the embassy.

== Ambassadors of France to Burundi ==
From	To	Ambassador
1962	1966	Marc Barbey
1966	1972	Hubert Yver de La Bruchollerie
1972	1976	Henri Bernard
1976	1979	René Moreau
1979	1982	Jean Fèvre
1982	1986	François Rey-Coquais
1986	1989	Robert Rigouzzo
1989	1993	Marcel Causse
1993	1995	Henri Crépin-Leblond
1995	1999	Jean-Pierre Lajaunie
1999	2003	Christian Daziano
2003	2006	Alain Girma
2006	2010	Joël Louvet
2010	2013	Jean Lamy
2013	2016	Gerrit Van Rossum
2016	2019	Laurent Delahousse
2019	2021	Stéphane Gruenberg
2021	2024	Jérémie Blin
2024	present	Sébastien Minot

== Consulate ==
=== French community ===
As of 31 December 2016, 290 French citizens are registered with the consular authorities in Burundi.

=== Electoral districts ===
After the law of 22 July 2013 reformed the representation of French citizens living abroad with the creation of consular councils in the diplomatic missions, the French citizens in a district consisting of Burundi, Kenya, Rwanda, Tanzania, Uganda, Zambia and Zimbabwe have been electing 3 consular councillors for a period of 3 years. They have 3 roles:

1. They are the locally based representatives of French citizens abroad;
2. They become part of one of the 15 districts who elect among themselves the members of the Assembly of French Citizens Abroad;
3. They become part of the electoral college who elects the senators representing French citizens living outside of France.

For elections to the Assembly of French Citizens Abroad, Burundi, until 2014, was part of the electoral district of Nairobi, which also consisted of Kenya, Rwanda, Tanzania and Uganda, and accounted for 2 seats. Since then, Burundi has been part of the electoral district "Central, Eastern and Southern Africa" based in Libreville and which chooses 5 of its 37 consular councillors to serve as part of the 90 members of the Assembly of French Citizens Abroad.

For the elections of legislative deputies of French citizens abroad, Burundi is located in the 10th district.

== See also ==
- Ministry for Europe and Foreign Affairs (France)
- Diplomatic missions of France
