= List of chapels in Paris =

This article is an incomplete list of the notable Roman Catholic chapels of Paris. A chapel is defined as a place for religious services which is attached to a non-religious institution, such as a palace, university, or cemetery.

== List ==
Name	Image	Address	Description
Sainte-Chapelle		Ile de la Cité (1st arrondissement of Paris	Royal chapel begun by Louis IX to display his collection of precious Biblical objects, and built between 1627 and 1648.
Sorbonne Chapel		17 rue de la Sorbonne, 5th arrondisement	Begun in 1635 by Cardinal Richelieu for the students of the Sorbonne University.The chapel contains his tomb.
Saint-Joseph-des-Carmes		70 rue de Vaugirard, 6th arrondissement of Paris	Built 1613-1625, Originally the chapel of a convent. It now is the chapel of the Catholic Institute of Paris.
Saint Vincent de Paul Chapel		95 rue de Sevres, 6th arrondissement of Paris	Built in 1827 to house the priory of the Congregation of the Mission, the order founded by Saint Vincent de Paul in 1632. The Chapel contains his tomb and his relics.
Saint-Louis Chapel, Paris of the École Militaire		13 Place Joffre, 7th arrondissement	Opened in 1773, dedicated to Saint Louis, Patron Saint of the Army. Napoleon Bonaparte had his sacrament of confirmation there. The tomb of French World War I commander Joseph Joffre is there.
Chapel of Our Lady of the Miraculous Medal		14 Rue-de-Bac, 7th arrondissement	The chapel was established in 1813 for the Daughters of Charity order founded by Louise de Marillac and Saint Vincent de Paul. It is dedicated to the visions and miracles attributed to the Virgin Mary.
Chapelle de Jesus-Enfant		29 Rue Las Cases, 7th arrondissement.	Built between 1878 and 1881 by architect Hippolyte Alexandre Destailleur. the chapel interior is richly decorated with ceramics, sculpture and paintings. The design was particularly inspired by English neo-Gothic architecture,
Chapelle Expiatoire		29 rue Pasquier, 8th arrondissdement	Built by King Louis XVIII for the tombs of his brother Louis XVI and sister-in-law Marie Antoinette, and other royal figures, on the site where they were originally buried during the French Revolution. The chapel was built in neoclassical style by architect Pierre-Francois-Leonard Fontaine.The tombs were moved from the chapel to the new necropole at the Basilica of Saint-Denis in 1815.
Chapel of Notre-Dame-de-La-Consolation, Paris		2 rue Jean-Goujon, 8th arrondissement	Built in 1898-1900 in the neo-Baroque style by city architect Albert-Desire Guibert. It commemorates the 140 persons who died in fire in 1897 which destroyed the Paris Charity Bazaar. His chapel plan won a gold medal at the Paris Exposition of 1900.
Chapel of the Lariboisiere Hospital		2 Rue Ambroise-Pare, 10th arrondissement.	Built 1846-54 in neo-Renaissance style by architect Martin-Pierre Gauthier, the new hospital and chapel were built in response to a cholera epidemic in 1832 which overwhelmed smaller Paris hospitals.
Chapel of Saint-Louis-de-la-Salpetriere, Paris		47 Boulevard de l'Hopital, 13th arrondissement	Built by Louis XIV between 1671 and 1678 as the chapel for a hospice, a prison, a place for orphans, the homeless and destitute.
Chapel of the Convent of Saint Francis, Paris, 14th arrondissement.		7 rue Marie-Rose, 14th arrondissement	The original Francisan convent in Paris was founded in 1219, but was destroyed during the French Revolution. The present chapel was completed in 1936, and is particularly noted for its unususal architecture and stained glass depicting the history of the Franciscans.
Notre-Dame-de-la-Compassion, Paris			Now a parish church, it was originally The Chapelle Royale Saint-Ferdinand, a memorial chapel to the Duke Ferdinand-Philippe d'Orleans, the royal heir killed in a road accident in 1842. The abundant stained-glass windows were designed by the painter Jean-Auguste-Dominique Ingres, and dramatic sculpture was added by Henri-Joseph de Triqueti.

== See also ==
- List of historic churches in Paris
- List of religious buildings in Paris

== Bibliography (in French) ==
- Dumoulin, Alexandra; Maingard, Jérôme; Chapelles de Paris (2012), Éditions Massin, Issy-Les-Moulineaux, ISBN 978-2-7072-0765-4
