= List of historic churches in Paris =

This is a description of fifty-nine churches in Paris classified by the French Ministry of Culture as national historic monuments. They are listed by Arrondissement.

== First arrondissement ==
Name	Image	Address	Type	Summary
Sainte-Chapelle		Ile de la Cité (1st arrondissement of Paris)	High Gothic and Flamboyant (1238–1248)	The royal chapel built by Louis IX to contain his collection of Passion relics, including Christ's Crown of Thorns – one of the most important relics in medieval Christendom. It is noted especially for its towering walls of stained glass.
Saint-Eustache		1 Rue de Jour (1st arrondissement of Paris)	Flamboyant Gothic Parish church (1532–1640)	Located next to Les Halles markets, rebuilt on a vast scale between 1532 and 1640 in the Flamboyant Gothic style, with touches of the Italian Renaissance.
Saint-Germain l'Auxerrois		Place du Louvre (1st arrondissement of Paris)	Rayonnant and Flamboyant Gothic Parish church (13th–15th century	Located next to the Louvre, this was the parish church of the Kings of France and their court. First constructed by Robert II the Pious in the 12th century, it was rebuilt on a larger scale in the 13th century, then enlarged again in the 15th and 17th centuries. Along with the Sainte-Chapelle, it the only Paris church that has its original Gothic porch.
Saint-Leu-Saint-Gilles		92 Rue Saint-Denis, 1st arrondissement of Paris	Early Gothic (1235), Renaissance (1611) 18th century (Crypt)	Since 1780 the church is the headquarters of the Knights of the Holy Sepulchre. Artwork includes alabaster sculptures from Nottingham (15th century) a statue by Jean Bullant (16th century), and colourful 19th century stained glass.
Saint-Roch, Paris		Rue St. Honoré, (1st arrondissement of Paris)	Baroque and Classical style parish church (1653–1740)	The church was begun by Louis XIV in 1653, but was not finished until 1740. The architecture was directly inspired by the new style of the Church of the Gesù in Rome. The interior offers a succession of three lavish chapels in succession after the choir, highly decorated with paintings and sculpture. In 1795 Napoleon Bonaparte ordered his soldiers to fire on counter-revolutionary soldiers gathered on the church steps, launching his military and political career.
Notre-Dame-de-l'Assomption		263 rue Saint-Honoré (1st arrondissement of Paris)	French Baroque, Classicism (1670–1676)	The church was constructed to the plans of Charles Errard for the convent of the Dames-de-l-Assomption, or the Nouvelles Haudriettes, founded in 1264. The rest of the convent was destroyed in the French Revolution, while the church became a depot for opera and theatre decoration. It was returned to the church by Napoleon in 1802, and in 1850, it was given to the Polish Catholic Mission in Paris. The dome is modelled after the Pantheon in Rome, and the porch after that of the Sorbonne in Paris. It contains work by French painters of the 18th century, including Carle Vanloo. The painting on the interior of the dome, "The Assumption of the Virgin", is by Charles de La Fosse, who also painted the interior of the dome of Les Invalides in Paris.

== 2nd arrondissement ==
Name	Image	Address	Type	Summary
Notre-Dame-des-Victoires		6 Rue Notre Dame des Victoires, Second Arrondissement	French Baroque, Classicism, (1629–1740)	The church was begun by King Louis XIII, to celebrate his victories over the Protestants at La Rochelle in the French Wars of Religion in 1628. Today it is one of ten minor basilicas located in the Île-de-France region of France. After the French Revolution, from 1796 to 1807, it was the first home of the Paris Bourse (stock exchange). It is known for the ex voto offerings left there by the faithful; Over 37,000 devotional plaques cover the walls of the interior. Notable art includes a series of seven large paintings by Charles-André van Loo (1705–1765). It also contains the funeral monument to Jean-Baptiste Lully court composer for Louis XIV.
Notre-Dame-de-Bonne-Nouvelle		25 Rue de la Lune, Second Arrondissement	Neoclassical architecture (1823–1830)	The first church on the site, built in 1551, was destroyed during the siege of Paris in 1591 by King Henry IV; the second was ruined during the French rRevolution. The new church was built between 1823 and 1830 by Étienne-Hippolyte Godde. Its style imitates a Roman temple. The choir of the church displays paintings by three notable Baroque artists from the 16th and 17th centuries.

== 3rd arrondissement ==
Name	Image	Address	Type	Summary
Saint-Martin-des-Champs Priory		254 Rue Saint-Martin, (3rd arrondissement of Paris)	Flamboyant Gothic (1420–1480) and French Renaissance architecture (1576–1586)	No longer an active church, The former church of the Saint-Martin-des-Champs Priory (1576–1585) is now part of the Musée des Arts et Métiers.
Saint-Nicolas-des-Champs, Paris	Saint-Nicolas-des-Champs	254 Rue Saint-Martin, (3rd arrondissement of Paris)	Flamboyant Gothic (1420–1480) and French Renaissance architecture (1576–1586)	Early parts of the church, including the west front, built 1420–1480, are in the Flamboyant Gothic style, while later portions, including the south portal, mostly built 1576–86, are examples of French Renaissance architecture. It is notable particularly for its Renaissance carved sculpture, decoration and large collection of French Renaissance paintings in the interior.
Saint Elizabeth of Hungary Church		195 Rue du Temple, (3rd arrondissement of Paris)	French Baroque (Begun 1628)	The church was consecrated by Marie de Medicis in 1628. After the destruction caused by the Revolution, the interior was rebuilt and doubled in size by architect Étienne-Hippolyte Godde (1781–1869), Architect of the City of Paris from 1813 to 1830. It is notable for its frescoes and its colorful 19th century stained glass.

== 4th arrondissement ==
Name	Image	Address	Type	Summary
Notre-Dame de Paris		Ile de la Cité (4th arrondissement of Paris)	High Gothic cathedral (began in 1163)	Construction of the cathedral began in 1163 under Bishop Maurice de Sully and was largely completed by 1260, though it was modified frequently in the centuries that followed. In the 1790s, during the French Revolution, Notre-Dame suffered extensive desecration; much of its religious imagery was damaged or destroyed. In the 19th century, the church was extensively restored. Badly damaged by fire in 2019, it has been restored.
Saint-Merri		78 Rue Saint Martin (4th arrondissement of Paris)	Flamboyant Gothic and Baroque (1510–1522)	The earliest church was built in 1200, while the present church dates from 1510 to 1522. The immense interior features lavish decor and paintings by Simon Vouet and Noël Coypel. Their theatrical paintings enhance the baroque decor in the transept and chapels.
Saint-Gervais-Saint-Protais		Place Saint Gervais 4th arrondissement of Paris	Gothic nave, Baroque façade (1494–1657)	The church was one of the first major churches on the right bank of the Seine. It was the successor to a 6th-century church, and to a second church built on higher ground to avoid the floods of the Seine. The present church, built between 1494 and 1657 due to the French Wars of Religion. The façade, the portion completed last by Salomon de Brosse, became the first example of the French classical style in Paris. The interior is largely Renaissance.
Saint-Louis-en-l'Île		19 Rue Saint-Louis en l'Île, (4th arrondissement of Paris)	French Baroque,(1624–1726)	The exterior is rather plain, with an 18th-century bell tower, but the interior displays the lavish French Baroque style of the 17th century. The arcades have rounded arches and pilasters with trompe-l'oeil channelling, joined with columns with Corinthian capitals, carved of travertine stone, and decorated with sculpted foliage and angels.
Church of Les Billettes, Paris		22 Rue des Archives (4th arrondissement)	Neoclassical architecture,(1299 cloister), (1758 church)	The medieval cloister (1299) from an earlier monastery is the oldest in Paris. The present church was built in 1758, and became a Lutheran church in 1808.
Eglise Saint-Paul-Saint-Louis		90 rue Saint Antoine	Baroque (1627–1641)	The church was built between 1627 and 1641, and was the first church of the Jesuit order built in Paris. King Louis XIII laid the first stone. The exterior was adapted from the Church of the Gesù in Rome, while the interior shows the influence of the Flemish Baroque style. It displays a collection of paintings by French Baroque artists from the workshop of Simon Vouet, and works by Germain Pilon and Eugène Delacroix. Music was an important part of the Jesuit church service; the directors of music of the church included the composers Marc-Antoine Charpentier and Jean-Philippe Rameau.

== 5th arrondissement ==
Name	Image	Address	Type	Summary
Saint-Julien-le-Pauvre		1 rue Saint-Julien-Le-Pauvre	Early Gothic (begun 1170) now a Byzantine Rite Catholic church	This was the parish church for the early University of Paris, and has vestiges of early Gothic architecture from the 12th and 13th centuries. In 1888 it was transformed into a Melkite Greek Catholic Church. Its interior features early Gothic columns, apse and sculpture, and a 19th- century iconostasis for the rites of the Orthodox church.
Saint-Medard, Paris		141 rue Mouffetard	Flamboyant Gothic, Renaissance, Classical (15th to 18th centuries)	A blend of historic Architectural styles, from Flamboyant to classical, and notable examples of Renaissance and classical art, particularly paintings, sculpture and 16th-century stained glass
Saint-Séverin		rue des Prêtres-Saint-Severin	Flamboyant Gothic Parish Church (1653–1740)	In the heart of the Latin Quarter, the church was first built in 1230, then, after a fire, rebuilt and enlarged in 15th to 17th centuries in the Flamboyant Gothic style. It became a parish church for students at the University of Paris and is one of the oldest churches on the Left Bank.
Saint-Étienne-du-Mont		Place Saint-Genevieve	Renaissance style (1492–1626)	The church, in the student area of the Left Bank, originally was next to the Basilica where King Clovis I and Saint Genevieve were buried. The present church was built between 1492 and 1626. The Pyramid-shaped façade dates to 1610. The architecture of the interior is Flamboyant Gothic, while the decoration added to it is in the French Renaissance style. It has its original Rood screen, an ornamental bridge separating the Choir from the Nave, built in about 1530.
Val-de-Grâce		1 Place Alphonse Laveran	French Baroque (1645–1665)	Part of an abbey proposed by Anne of Austria to celebrate the birth of her son Louis XIV in 1638, it was begun in 1645 by architect François Mansart, and completed in 1665 by Gabriel Le Duc. The abbey and church were turned into a hospital during the French Revolution. and then became part of the Val-de-Grâce Hospital, which was closed in 1979. The church is attached to the diocese of the French military, and is open to visitors at certain hours.
Saint-Jacques-du-Haut-Pas		1 Place Alphonse Laveran	Flamboyant Gothic and French Baroque (1582-1687=	In the 17th century the church became a center of the Jansenism movement, which called for greater simplicity and a minimum of decoration, which is reflected in the austere interior. It contains the tombs of the astronomer Giovanni Domenico Cassini (1625–1712), the first to discover the moons of Saturn and to measure accurately actual size of France.

== 6th arrondissement ==
Name	Image	Address	Type	Summary
Saint-Germain-des-Prés (abbey)		Saint-Germain-des-Prés	Romanesque/Gothic (consecrated 1133)	Originally the church of a Benedictine abbey founded in the 6th century, by Childebert. I, the son of Clovis, King of the Franks. The first church was destroyed by the Vikings and rebuilt. The present church was consecrated in 1163, and is considered the oldest church in Paris. The flying buttresses, from the 12th century, were the first on a Paris church. It was named for Saint Germain, an early Bishop of the city.
Saint-Joseph-des-Carmes		70 rue de Vaugirard	Classical, Baroque (1613–1620)	The exterior is severe classical, while the interior is a showcase of the Italian Baroque style. Originally built as the chapel of a convent of the Order of Discalced Carmelites, it is now the chapel of the Séminary of the Carmelites, which is part of the Institut Catholique de Paris. It contains a series of chapels highly decorated with Baroque paintings, sculpture and architecture.
Saint-Sulpice, Paris		Place Saint-Sulpice	Neoclassical architecture (17th–18th century)	Originally built in the 12th century under the authority of the Abbey of Saint-Germaine-des-Prés, it was rebuilt by Anne of Austria between 1646 and 1678. The classical façade was added between 1733 and 1777. Work was interrupted by the French Revolution, and the south tower was never entirely completed. It is the 3rd-largest church in Paris, after Notre Dame and Saint Eustache.
Notre-Dame-des Champs		91 boulevard du Montparnasse	Neoclassical architecture (1867–1876)	The first church on the site was destroyed during the French Revolution. It was rebuilt with an iron frame designed by Gustave Eiffel, twenty years before the Eiffel Tower, with a design inspired by Romanesque architecture. The primary artistic feature is a set of twenty-two large paintings above the galleries in the nave and the choir, depicting the life of the Virgin Mary by the artist Joseph Aubert (1849–1924).
Saint Vincent de Paul Chapel		95 rue de Sèvres	Neoclassical exterior, highly theatrical interior (1826–1827)	The church displays the reliquary of Saint Vincent de Paul (died 1660), with his likeness, suspended dramatically over the altar

== 7th arrondissement ==
Name	Image	Address	Type	Summary
Sainte-Clotilde, Paris		12 Rue de Martignac, (7th arrondissement of Paris)	Neo-Gothic (1846–1856)	The Restoration and July Monarchy brought a new interest in Gothic architecture. The architect Théodore Ballu completed the building using a modern iron frame with traditional stonework. The sculptor James Pradier made a series of seven bas-reliefs celebrating the stations of the cross in classical style, rather than the Gothic style. The paintings and decoration of the interior reflect the changing tastes and technology of the mid-19th century. The metal armature of the organ was made by Gustave Eiffel, creator of the Eiffel Tower, while the organist at the time was composer César Franck.
Saint-François-Xavier, Paris		12, Place du President Mithouard, (7th arrondissement of Paris)	Renaissance Revival style (1861–1873)	The church contains the tomb of Saint Madeleine-Sophie Barat founder of the Society of the Sacred Heart of Jesus in 1800 to provide educational opportunities for girls after the French Revolution. It also known for its collection of Italian Baroque and Mannerist paintings, including a work by Tintoretto.
Cathedral of Saint-Louis-des-Invalides, Paris		Les Invalides in the 7th arrondissement of Paris	Baroque Architecture (17th century)	The church was built within Les Invalides as the parish church for the army veterans who lived there. It was commissioned by King Louis XIV and was built beginning in 1676 by architect Jules Hardouin-Mansart. It is directly connected with the Dome des Invalides, which contained a royal chapel and now holds the Tomb of Napoleon.
Saint-Pierre-du-Gros-Caillou		52 rue Dominique, 7th arrondissement of Paris	Neoclassical architecture (1822)	The church was built by Etienne-Hippolyte Godde, the very prolific architect of the city of Paris from 1813 to 1830, who built or rebuilt thirty churches, planned the entry to the Père Lachaise cemetery, and made the first design for the Arc de Triomphe.

== 8th arrondissement ==
Name	Image	Address	Type	Summary
La Madeleine, Paris		Place de la Madeleine, (8th arrondissement of Paris)	Neoclassicism (1764–1806)	Begun by Louis XV in 1764 to decorate the end of the new Rue Royale, leading to the redesigned Place de la Concorde. Work was halted by the French Revolution, and resumed by Napoleon Bonaparte, who intended it as a monument to the glory of the French Army. After his downfall it was opened as a parish church, Completed between 1823 and 1830, it is an early example of French Neoclassicism. The interior decoration was inspired by that of classical Roman baths.
Saint-Augustin, Paris		46 boulevard Malesherbes (8th arrondissement of Paris)	Neo-Romanesque and Neo-Byzantine (1860–1868)	Built under Napoleon III by Paris chief architect Victor Baltard, it was the first Paris church to have a cast-iron framework, which was gilded and made part of the decoration, and contains an abundance of polychrome decoration and 19th-century art and stained glass.
Église Saint-Philippe-du-Roule		154 Rue du Faubourg-Saint-Honore (8th arrondissement of Paris	Neo-Classical architecture (1774–1784)	Architect Jean Chalgrin is best known as the architect of the Arc de Triomphe. The church was modeled after the early Christian basilicas in Rome and was enlarged in 1845 by Étienne-Hippolyte Godde

== 9th arrondissement ==
Name	Image	Address	Type	Summary
Saint-Louis-d'Antin		63 rue Caumartin, 9th arrondissement of Paris	Neoclassicism (1780–1782)	Located near the main department stores in the center of Paris, the church has a very austere neo-classical exterior but an interior richly decorated with paintings, murals and neoclassical stained glass.
Notre-Dame-de-Lorette, Paris		8 bis, rue de Châteaudun, 9th arrondissement	Neoclassicism (1823–1838)	The place of baptism of Claude Monet and Georges Bizet, it is noted for its early Neoclassicism, lavish murals, paintings and coffered ceilings.
Saint-Eugène-Sainte-Cécile		6 Rue Sainte-Cecile, 9th arrondissement of Paris	Neo-Gothic style (1854–1855)	Commissioned by Emperor Napoleon III, and designed by Louis-Auguste Voileau and Louis-Adrien Lusson, this was the first Paris church to employ a fully iron framework, giving it a very open interior, and very large and colorful stained glass windows. It has no bell tower to avoid disturbing students at the nearby Paris Conservatory of Music.
Sainte-Trinité, Paris		Place d'Etienne d'Orves, 3 rue de la Trinité (9th arrondissement of Paris)	Neoclassicism in France and Beaux-Arts architecture (1861–1867)	Built under the patronage of Napoleon III, the church is noted for its highly visible 65-meter-tall belfry and its harmonious and lavish interior decoration, including paintings, sculpture, and stained glass windows in the Beaux-Arts style or Second Empire Style. The composer Olivier Messiaen was organist of the church for sixty years.

== 10th arrondissement ==
Name	Image	Address	Type	Summary
Saint-Vincent-de-Paul, Paris		Place Franz-Liszt, (10th arrondissement of Paris)	Neoclassicism (1824–1844)	Located on the site where Saint Vincent de Paul l (1581–1660) carried out his mission of helping the poor. From 1831 onward, the architect was Jacques Hittorff, whose most famous later work was the Gare du Nord railway station. The interior features a frieze by Hippolyte Flandrin, called "The Mission of the Church, the length of the building on both sides, with one hundred thirty-five figures. The main altar is covered by a large baldequin or canopy, in the form of a triumphal arch. Looking down on the altar is a monumental bronze statue of the crucifixion, made by François Rude
Saint-Laurent, Paris		n 68 bis Boulevard de Magenta.(10th arrondissement of Paris)	Neo-Gothic façade built in 1860s	The 15th-century interior was largely rebuilt in the 19th century to align with the new boulevards built around it by Napoleon III. The church is known for its collections of 19th- and 20th-century stained glass and its 19th-century art.

== 11th arrondissement ==
Name	Image	Address	Type	Summary
Sainte Marguerite		36 rue Saint Bernard, (11th arrondissement of Paris)	Neoclassical architecture,(1625–1764)	Best known for its dramatic interior, paintings and the Chapel of the Saints of Purgatory, with murals in trompe-l'oeil style painted by Paolo Antonio Brunetti (1723–1783).|
Saint-Ambroise, Paris		71 Boulevard Voltaire, (11th arrondissement of Paris), Metro station Saint-Ambroise	Second Empire style (1863–1869)	A neo-classical work of Theodore Ballu, Napoleon III's favorite architect for Paris churches

== 12th arrondissement ==
Name	Image	Arrondissement	Type	Summary
Église Notre-Dame-de-la-Nativité de Bercy		9 Place Lachameaudie, 12th arrondissement of Paris	Neo-Romanesque (1824 and 1873)	The first church on the site was a convent chapel, built 1677; a new church built in 1824 was burned by the Paris Commune in 1871, and was reconstructed on the same site in 1873. To replace the murals destroyed in the fire, the church received four large-scale murals by notable French 17th-century religious painters, including Jacques Stella, Daniel Hallé and Charles de La Fosse
Saint-Esprit, Paris		186 avenue Daumesnil, (12th arrondissement of Paris)	Neo-Byzantine (1928–1935)	The church was designed by Paul Touron and completed in 1935. It was inspired by Neo-Byzantine architecture, particularly the Hagia Sophia church in Istanbul. The exterior is built of re-enforced concrete covered with brick from Burgundy, and topped by a 75-meter-tall bell tower. The interior is decorated with murals created by Maurice Denis and the artists of the Ateliers d'Art Sacré devoted to a revival of Christian religious painting.

== 13th arrondissement ==
Name	Image	Arrondissement	Type	Summary
Notre-Dame de la Gare		Place Jeanne-d'Arc, (13th arrondissement of Paris)	Neo-Romanesque (1855–1864)	The church was built during the French Second Empire under Napoleon III in a rapidly growing working-class neighborhood, and took its name from the freight railroad nearby. The nave is dark and austere, but the choir is lavishly decorated with paintings and murals. It also contains an exceptional collection of early-20th-century stained glass.
Sainte-Anne de la Butte-aux-Cailles		188 rue Tolbiac in the 13th arrondissement of Paris	Neo-Roman, Neo-Byzantine (1894–1912, stained-glass windows in 1938)	The church is noted for its towers, Neo-Byzantine interior, sculpture, and its colourful Art Deco stained-glass windows (1938)

== 14th arrondissement ==
Name	Image	Arrondissement	Type	Summary
Notre-Dame du Travail		59 rue Vercingetorix, 14th arrondissement of Paris	Neo-Romanesque exterior, Neo-Romanesque, early modern and Art Nouveau interior (1897–1902)	The façade is largely in the Neo-Romanesque style. The most distinctive interior feature is the modern exposed-steel framework, intended to make the factory workers of the neighborhood feel at home. The interior is lavishly decorated with frescoes, paintings, and sculpture of the period.
Notre-Dame du Rosaire, Paris		19 rue Raymond-Losserand, 14th arrondissement of Paris	Neo-Classical and Neo-Byzantine	Designed by architect Pierre Sardou (1910–1912, stressing simplicity and classical forms, the building's notable features include the colorful stained-glass windows by Henri-Marcel Magne (1877–1944)
Saint-Dominique Church (Paris)		20 rue de la Tomb Issoire, 14th arrondissement of Paris	Neo-Romano-Byzantine architecture Art Deco decoration (1913–1921)	One of the first reinforced- concrete churches in Paris, it has a dome and imaginative Art Deco murals, sculpture and mosaics.

== 15th arrondissement ==
Name	Image	Arrondissement	Type	Summary
Saint-Christophe-de-Javel, Paris		4 rue Saint-Christophe (15th arrondissement of Paris)	Gothic revival, Art Deco (1926–1930)	Built by the architect Charles-Henri Besnard, it combines Gothic revival elements with modern construction materials, such as molded reinforced concrete. The interior is covered with Art Deco frescoes and murals.

== 16th arrondissement ==
Name	Image	Arrondissement	Type	Summary
Saint-Pierre-de-Chaillot		31 av. Marceau (16th arrondissement)	Neo-Byzantine style and Art Deco.(1933–1938)	The first parish church was built in the 11th century. The old church hosted the funerals of Guy de Maupassant in 1893 and Marcel Proust in 1922.
Saint-Honore d'Eylau		64 bis avenue Raymond Poincaré, 16th arrondissement	Neo-Gothic architecture (1896)	The church was inspired by the modern iron structures at the 1889 Paris Exposition Univerelle, and has abundant Art Deco windows and decoration.

== 17th arrondissement ==
Name	Image	Arrondissement	Type	Summary
Notre-Dame-de-la-Compassion, Paris		Place du Général Koenig (17th arrondissement of Paris)	Neo-Byzantine style (1842–1843)	The chapel was originally built as a memorial chapel for the heir to the French throne, Ferdinand Philippe, Duke of Orléans, who was killed in a road accident in 1842. In 1970 it was moved a short distance to make space for the new Palais des Congrès. It became a parish church in 1993. Its decoration includes stained-glass windows designed by Jean-Auguste-Dominique Ingres, and sculpture by Henri de Triqueti
Sainte-Odile, Paris		2 Avenue Stephane-Mallarmé (17th arrondissement of Paris)	Art Deco (1935–1946)	An Art Deco church with the highest bell tower in Paris, and an Art Deco porch, it has an exceptional collection of Art Deco stained-glass windows, sculpture and mosaic.

|-

== 18th arrondissement ==
Name	Image	Arrondissement	Type	Summary
Basilica of Sacré-Coeur de Montmartre		Butte of Montmartre, (18th arrondissement of Paris)	Neo-Byzantine basilica (1875–1914)	The church, dedicated to the Sacred Heart of Christ, is located at the highest point in Paris, It was first proposed in 1870 as penitence for the "Misfortunes of France", particularly the defeat of France in the Franco-German War of 1870. The vast gilded and ceramic Neo-Byzantine mural in the dome, covering 475 square meters, illustrates the Celestial Kingdom of Christ.
Saint-Denys de la Chapelle		Rue de la Chapelle, 18th arrondissement	Early Gothic (Interior) and Neoclassical architecture (facade)	The church was originally outside of the city. The interior of the church dates to 1204, making it among the oldest in the city. Joan of Arc is said to have prayed in the chapel on the eve of her unsuccessful attempt in 1429 to recapture Paris from the English. The classical façade was added in the 18th century.
Saint-Jean de Montmartre		19 Rue des Abbesses 18th arrondissement	Art Nouveau built 1894–1904	The church was the first in Paris to be built of reninforced concrete. It combines a novel interior built of steel with lavish Art Nouveau paintings and decoration.

|-

== 19th arrondissement ==
Name	Image	Arrondissement	Type	Summary
Église Saint-Serge, Paris		93 rue de Crimée, 19th arrondissement of Paris	German Protestant (1861), Russian Orthodox (1924)	Built as a German Protestant church in 1861, it became a Russian Orthodox Church in 1924. A notable feature is the Iconostasis, with images of more than one hundred Russian saints.
Saint-Jacques-Saint-Christophe de la Villette		6 Place de Bitche, 19th arrondissement of Paris	Neo-classical (1841–44)	The church was built in 1841–44 in the reign of King Louis Philippe along the new Ourcq Canal, in the Neo-Classical style. The interior is noted for the frescoes painted in the 1930s by G. LeDuc and the stained-glass windows from the 1920s.
Saint-Jean-Baptiste de Belleville		139 Rue de Belleville, 19th arrondissement of Paris	Neo-Gothic (1854–1857)	A very refined example of Neo-Gothic by the Parisian master of that style, Jean-Baptiste Lassus, it is notable for its murals and fine stained-glass windows.

== 20th arrondissement ==
Name	Image	Arrondissement	Type	Summary
Church of Saint-Jean-Bosco, Paris		79 rue Alexandre-Dumas	Art Deco (1933–1937)	Built in the 1930s in the Art Deco style, it features a soaring tower and unified Art Deco furnishings, paintings, frescos, mosaics and sculpture.
Notre-Dame-de-la-Croix de Ménilmontant		3 place de Ménilmontant	Second Empire (mix of Gothic and Romanesque styles)	In the mid-19th century the Ménilmontant neighbourhood was growing rapidly, so construction of a larger parish church began in 1863. The church was designed by the architect Louis-Jean-Antoine Herét (1821–1899) and was consecrated in 1869 (though not completed until 1880). Of exceptional height and length, it is one of the largest churches in Paris. In 1871, the church was a meeting hall for members of the Paris Commune.
Saint-Germain de Charonne		4 place Saint-Blaise	Mix of styles from the 12th, 15th and 17th centuries	Saint-Germain de Charonne is one of the oldest churches in Paris. It was originally the village church of Charonne, until the village was integrated into Paris in 1860. The church is one of only two in Paris that have retained their traditional cemeteries. A plaque in the cemetery marks the location of a mass burial of nearly 800 fédérés who fought with the insurrection during the Paris Commune.

== See also ==
- Historic chapels of Paris
- List of monuments historiques in Paris
- List of religious buildings in Paris

== Bibliography (in French) ==
- Dumoulin, Aline; Ardisson, Alexandra; Maingard, Jérôme; Antonello, Murielle; Églises de Paris (2010), Éditions Massin, Issy-Les-Moulineaux, ISBN 978-2-7072-0683-1
