= Chapel of the Convent of Saint Francis, Paris =

Roman Catholic chapel in Paris, France

Coordinates: 48.8263°N 2.3303°E

- Chapelle du Couvent des Freres Franciscans
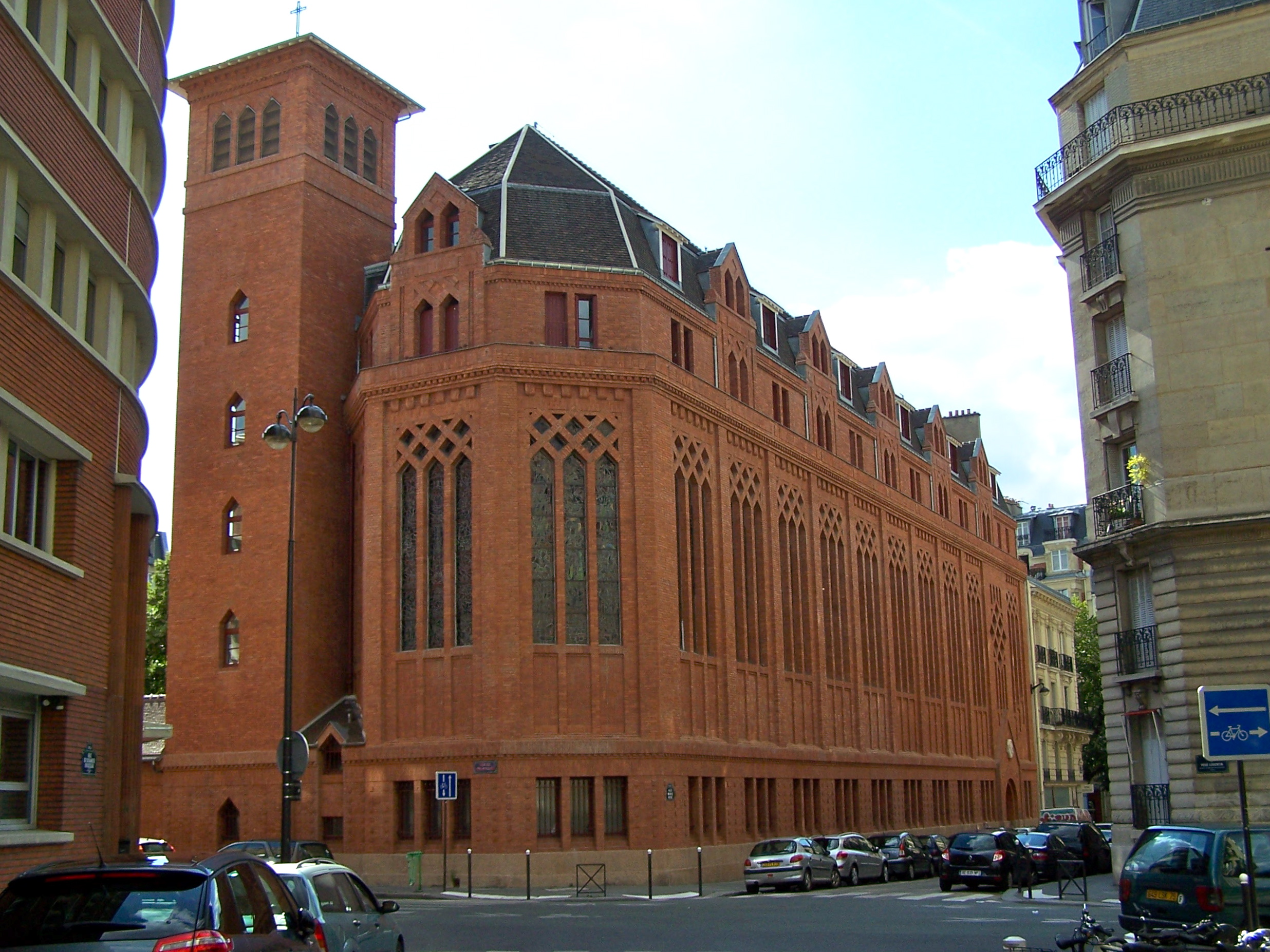
- Convent of Saint Francis, Paris

Location
- Location: 7 Rue Marie-Rose, 14th arrondissement of Paris (nearest Metro: Alesia)
- Interactive map of Chapel of the Convent of Saint Francis, Paris

The Chapel of the Convent of Saint Francis is a Roman Catholic chapel serving the clerical students of the Franciscan order in Paris. It is located within the convent building at 7 Rue Marie-Rose in the 14th arrondissement of Paris. The chapel was consecrated in 1936. It is particularly known for stained glass windows.

== History ==
The convent of the Franciscan order had a long and complicated history in Paris. The order was founded by Saint Francis of Assisi in 1209, and established a first convent in Paris in 1219, near the Basilica of Saint-Denis, during the lifetime of the founder. and then founded the Convent of the Cordeliers near the abbey of Saint-Germaine-des-Pres in 1230. However, after the French Revolution, the order was suppressed and the buildings destroyed to make room for a medical school. The order returned to Paris in 1865, but was expelled again in 1880, accused of trying to create a France "without God and without a King." After the formal separation of French state and church in 1905, the order quietly returned to Paris in 1919, first secretly then in public. The present convent, built beginning in 1934, was designed by Paul Gelis and Jean Hulot, made of red brick with a bare minimum of external ornament.

== Interior ==
The chapel was consecrated in 1936, and is also built of brick, along with rose-colored stone from Burgundy and Prety. The nave is lined with lateral chapels on the south side. Pointed brick arches separate the sections of the nave. The choir is separated from the nave by a triumphal arch. The choir is softly lit by the light of three stained glass windows, representing the three orders founded by Saint Francis of Assisi.

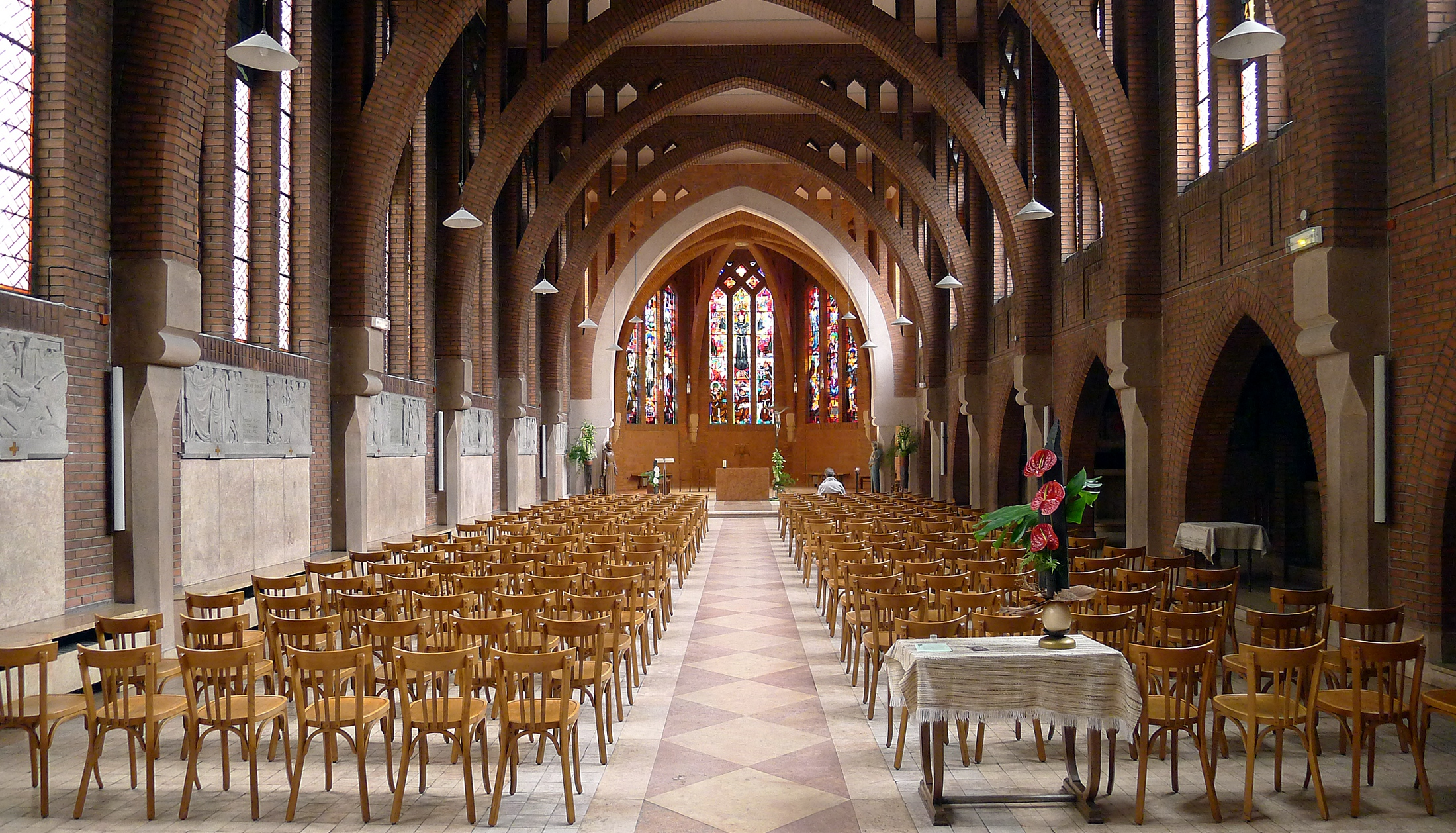
Brick and stone arches of Chapel interior, facing choir

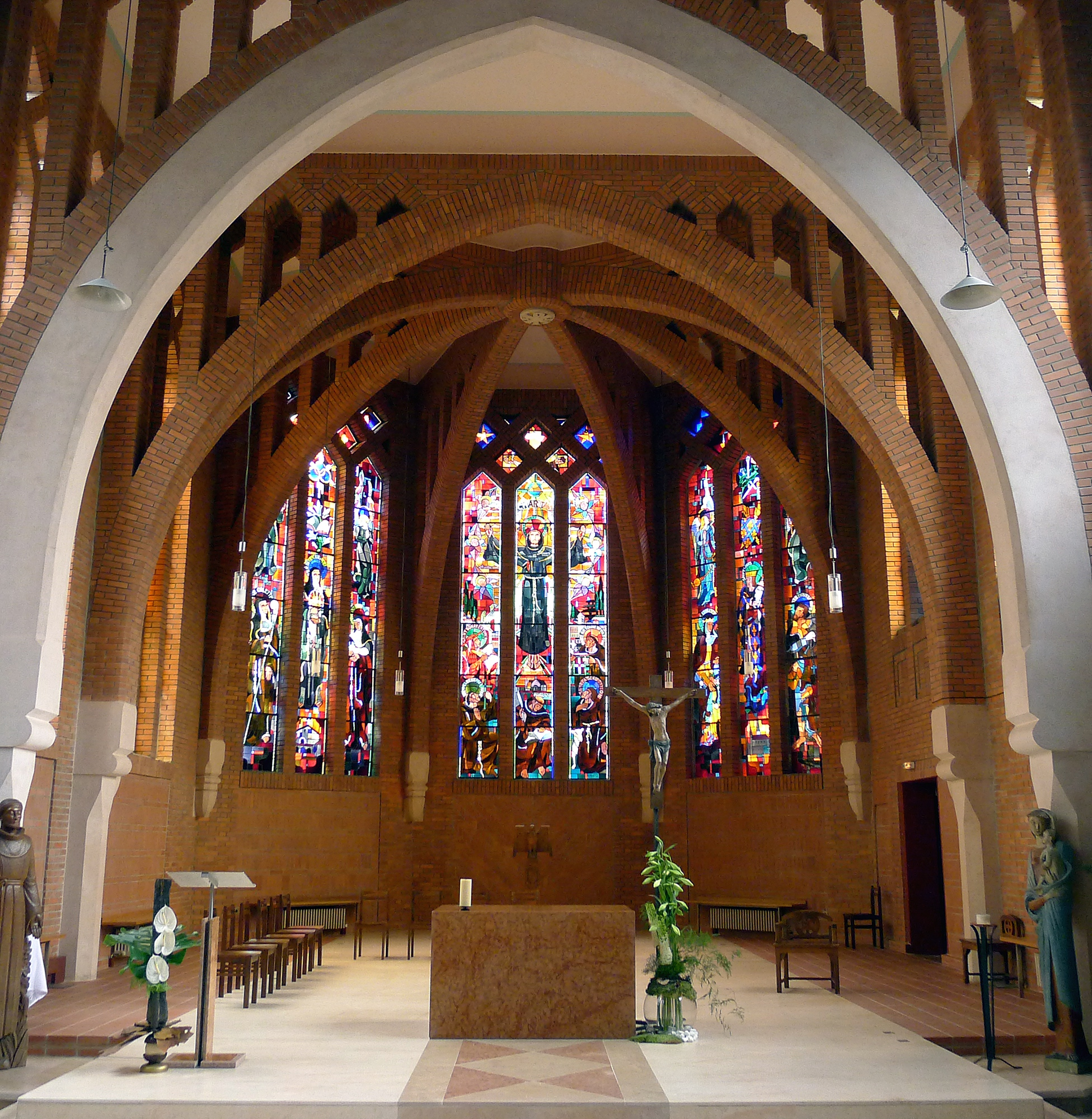
The Choir

== Art and decoration ==
=== Stained glass ===
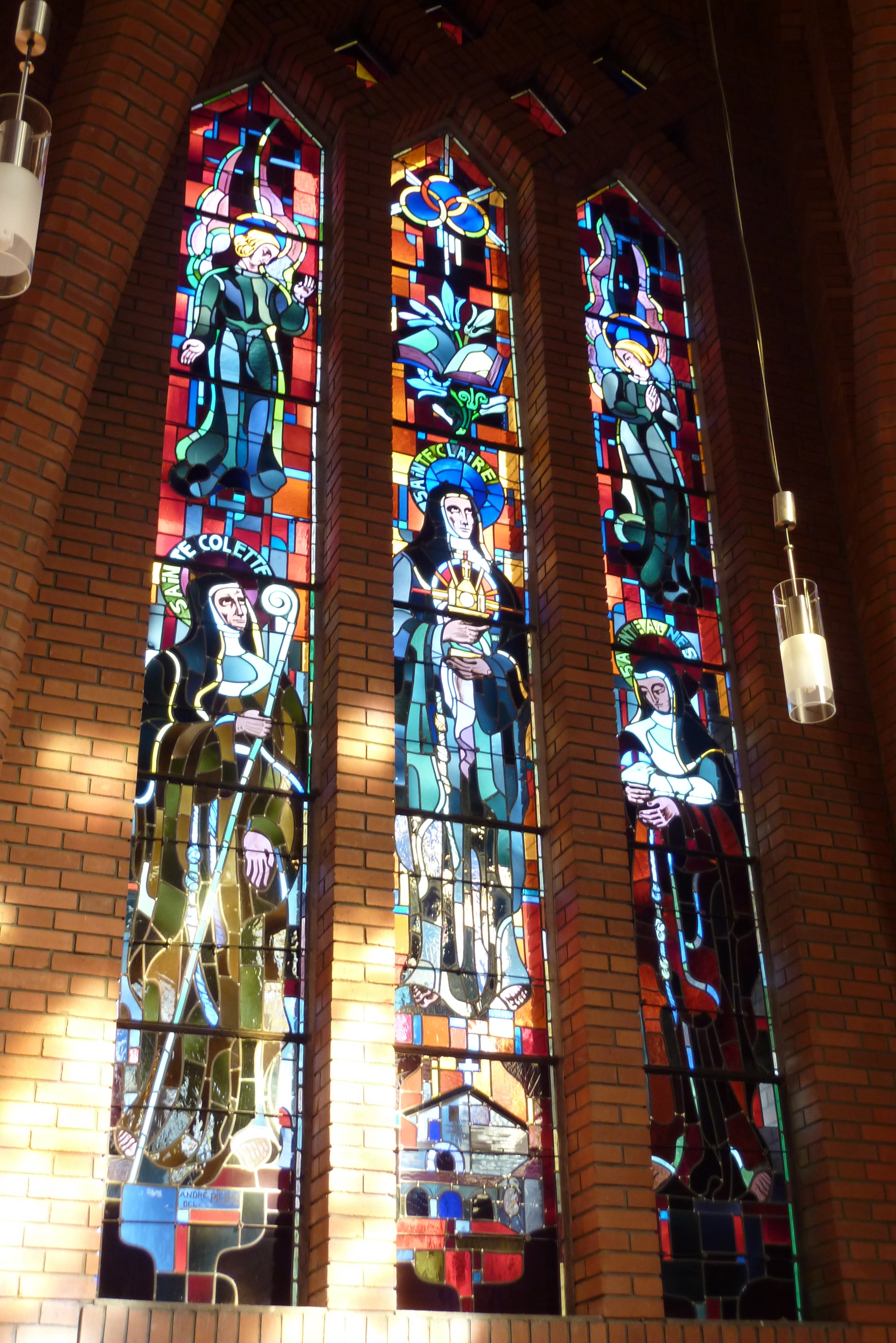
Left window of choir: Saint Claire, Saint Colette, Saint Agnes

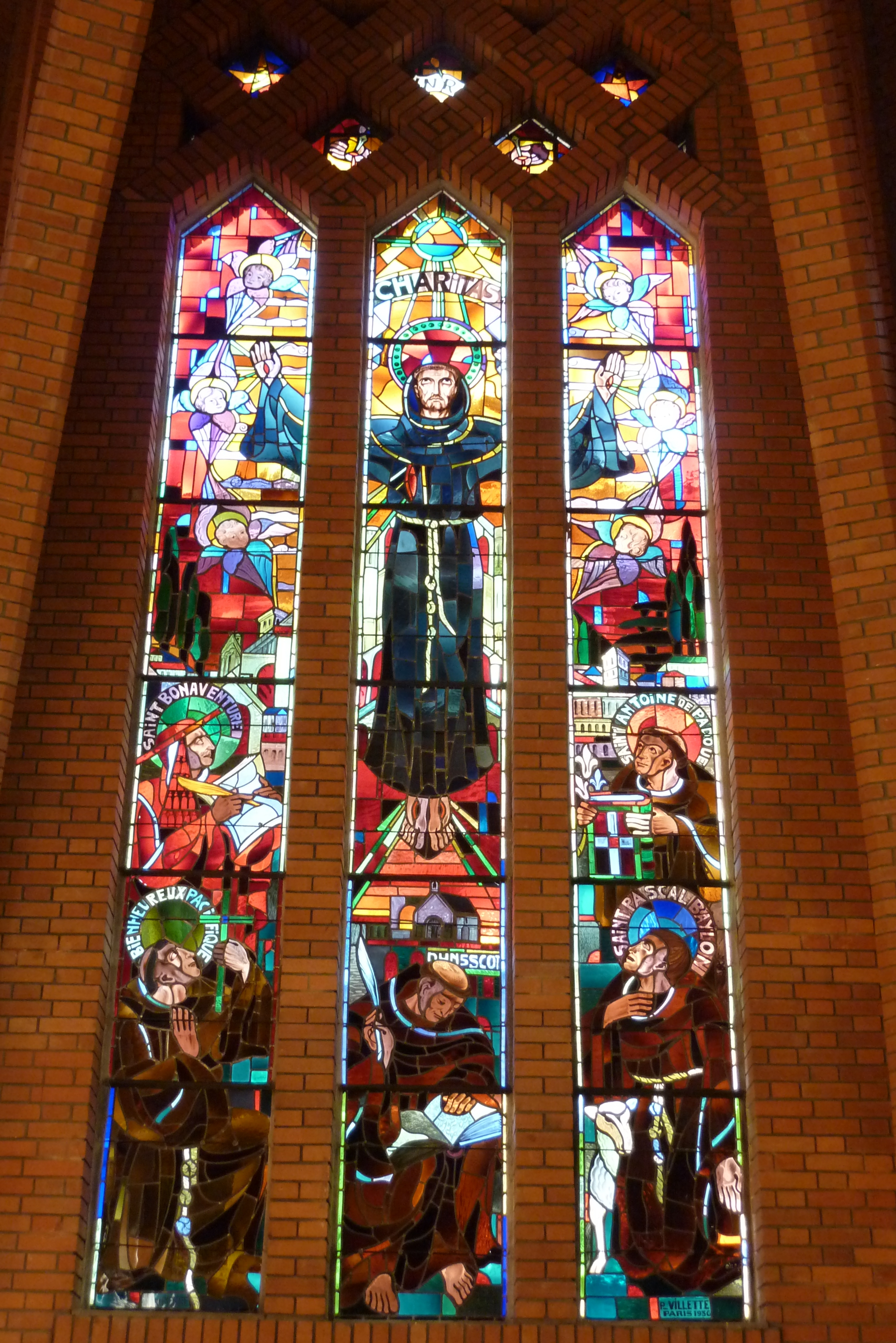
The central window in the choir: Saint Francis founds three orders

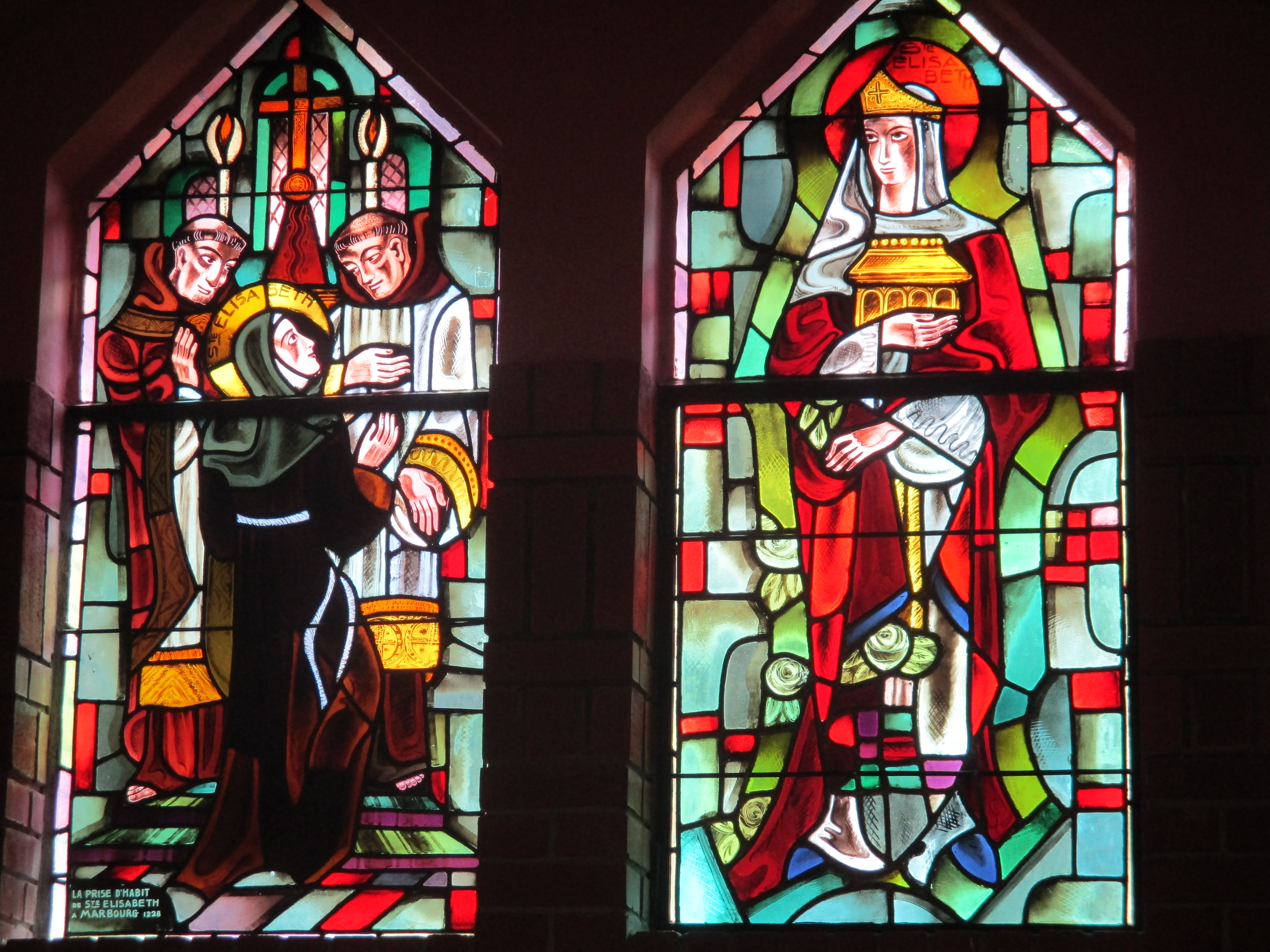
Images of Saint Elizabeth of Hungary (in the chapel named for her)

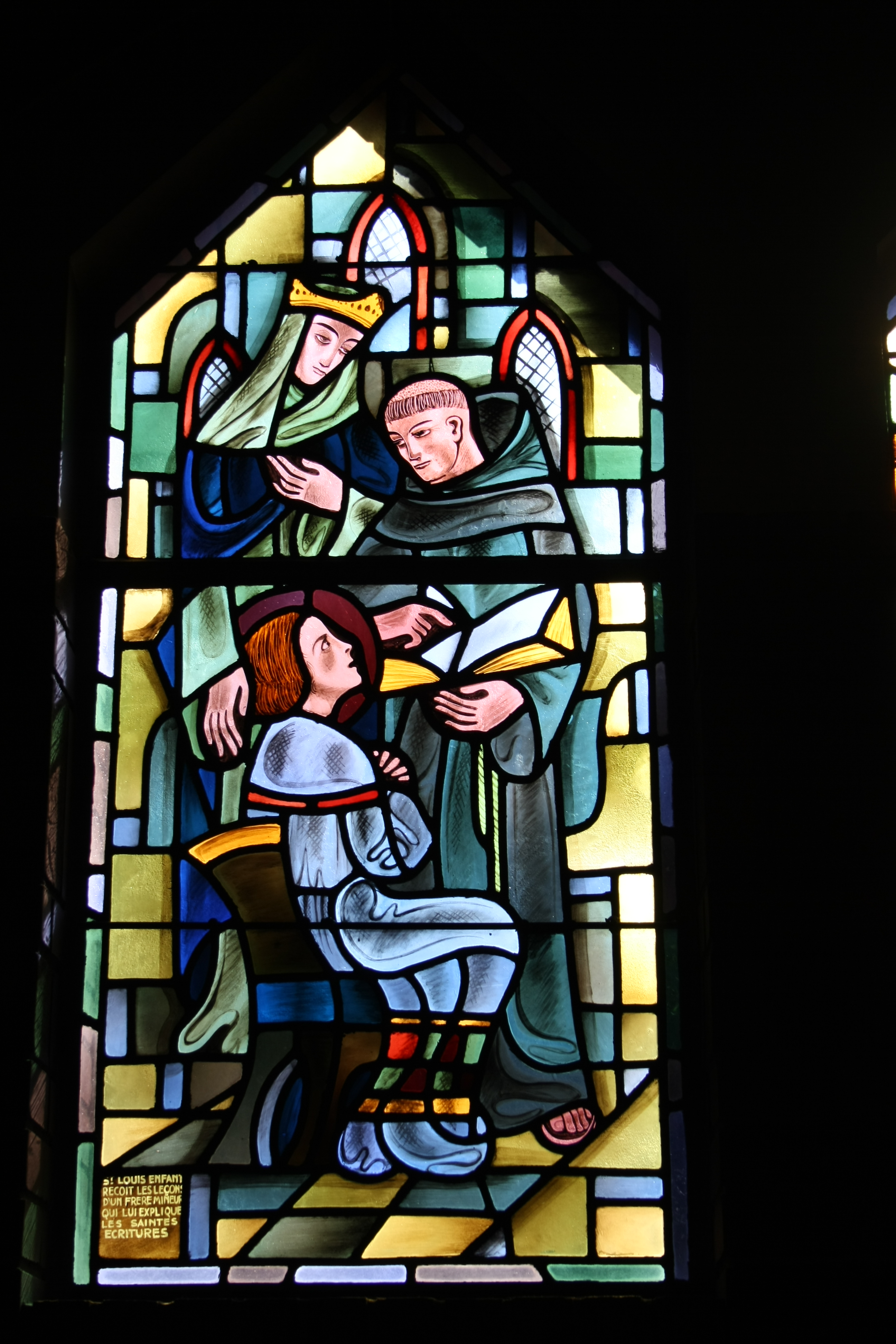
King Louis IX with Saint Francis

=== Organ ===
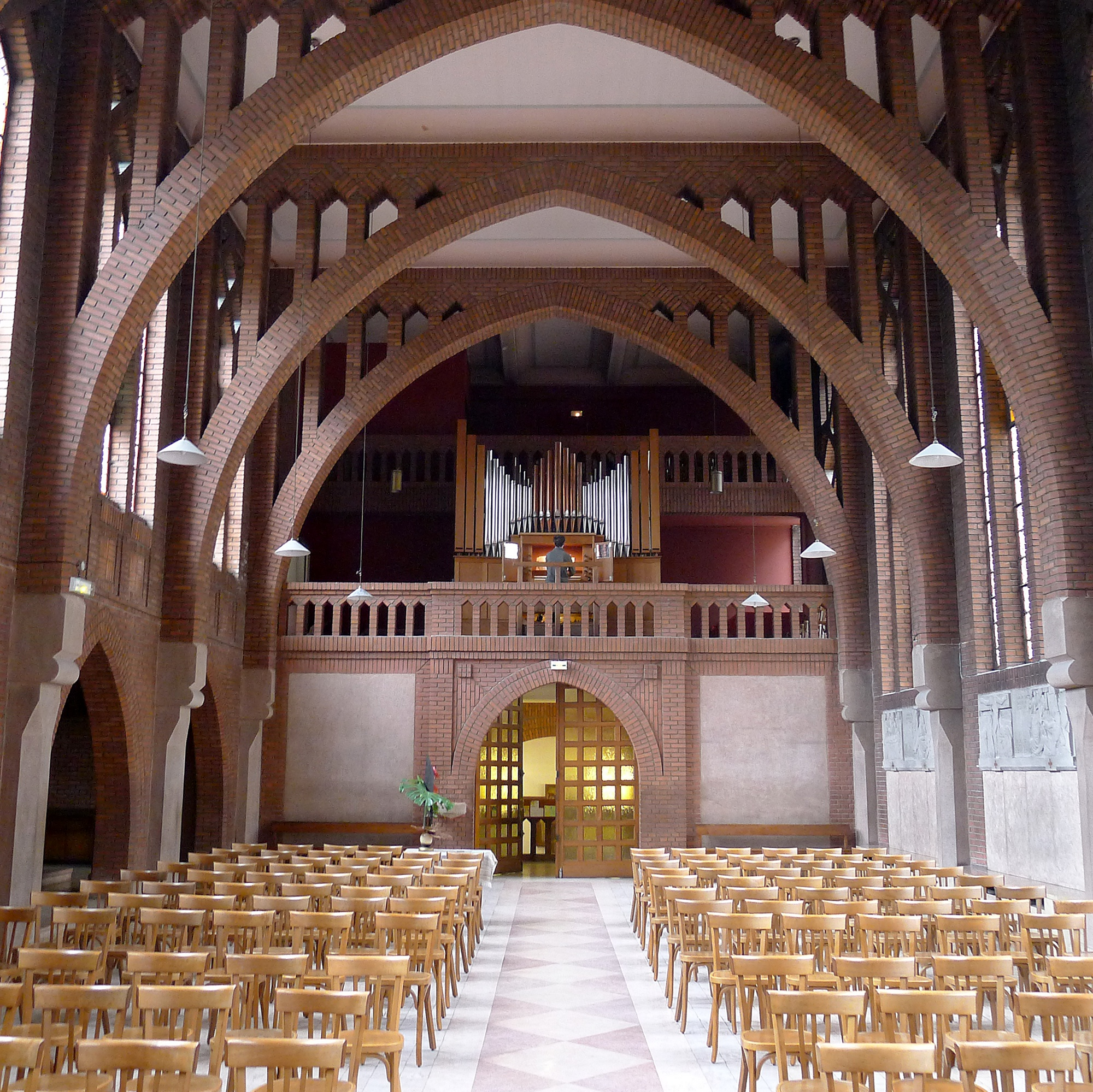
The organ in the tribune

== See also ==
- Historic chapels of Paris
