= Chapelle de Jesus-Enfant =

19th-century Roman Catholic chapel in Paris, France

Coordinates: 48°51′32″N 2°19′06″E

Chapelle de Jesus-Enfant, Paris
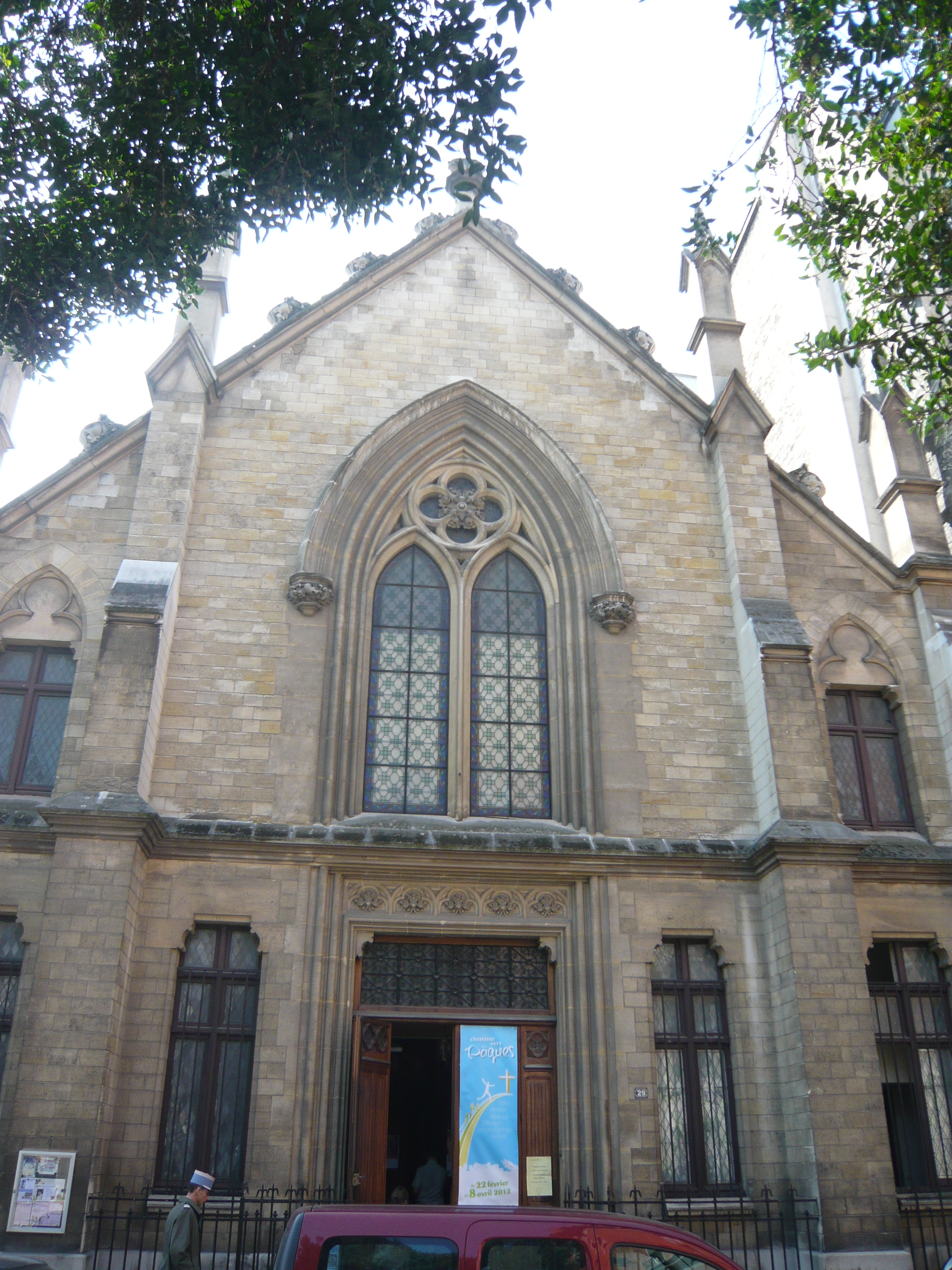
- Chapelle de Jesus-Enfant, Paris

Religion
- Affiliation: Catholic Church
- Province: Archdiocese of Paris
- Rite: Roman Rite

Location
- Location: 7th arrondissement of Paris
- Interactive map of Chapelle de Jesus-Enfant, Paris

Architecture
- Style: Neo-Gothic
- Groundbreaking: 1878
- Completed: 1881

The Chapelle de Jesus-Enfant ("Chapel of the Infant Jesus") is a Roman Catholic chapel located at 29 Rue Las-Cases in the 7th arrondissement of Paris.

== History ==
The chapel was built between 1878 and 1881 by the architect Hippolyte Alexandre Destailleur especially for the students of the Catechism in the style of Neo-Gothic architecture.

On March 16, 1956 Jacques Chirac future president of the French Republic between 1995 and 2007, married Bernadette Chodron de Courcel in the chapel.

== Interior ==
While the exterior of the church is built in a straightforward Neo-Gothic style, the interior much more lavish. The sanctuary is covered with wooden vaults supported by pointed arches, divided into small light compartments. The vault of the chapel resembles the English Gothic style, particularly the medieval ceiling of the Hall of Westminster Palace The architect had travelled ofen to London, and was familiar with the style.

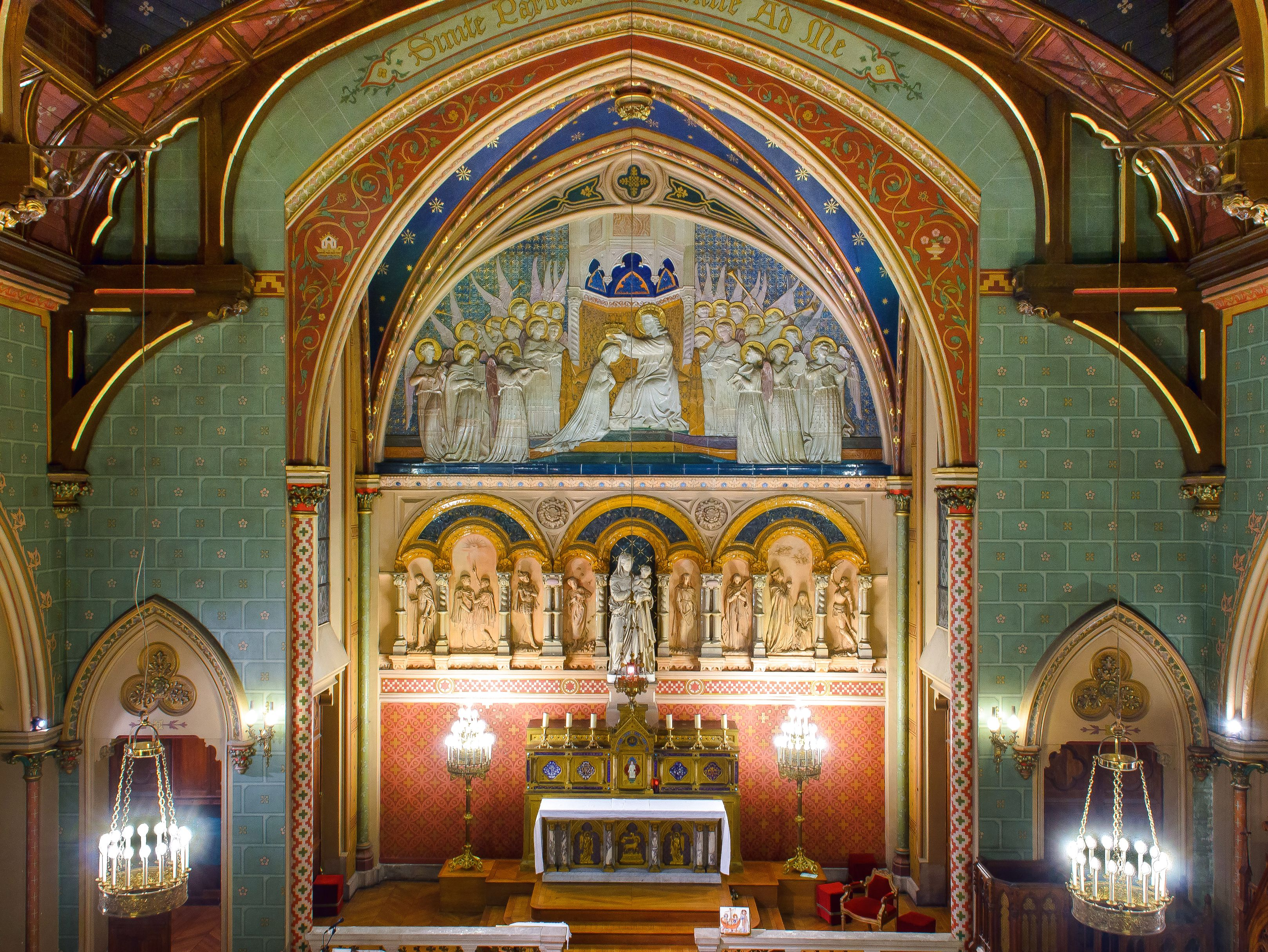
The "Crowning of the Virgin", inspired by a work Fra Angelico; in the apse.

The interior decoration is as lavish as the architecture. In the choir, the walls, vaults, arches and pillars are all painted, inspired by the interior of the lower level of Sainte Chapelle in Paris. The chevet in the apse is decorated with a colorful retable in ceramic, "The Crowning of the Virgin" inspired by a work of Fra Angelico in 1430-1432 which is now in the Louvre. The cereamic recreation in the chapel was made in the workshops of Gaston Virevent (1837-1926)

Below the depiction of the crowning of the Virgin is a group of sculptures made of terre-cuite by Clement d'Astanieres, born in 1841. They depict Saint Cecile, Saint Rogatien, Saint Clotilde, and others.

=== Organ ===
THe organ of the church was built by Cavaille-Coll in 1830. It was originally built for the made for the Convent of Carmes-Billettes, and was moved to its present location in 1968.
