= Chapel of Saint-Louis-de-la-Salpetriere, Paris =

Roman Catholic chapel in Paris, France

Coordinates: 48.850974°N 2.323770°E

Chapel Saint-Louis-de-la-Salpetriere
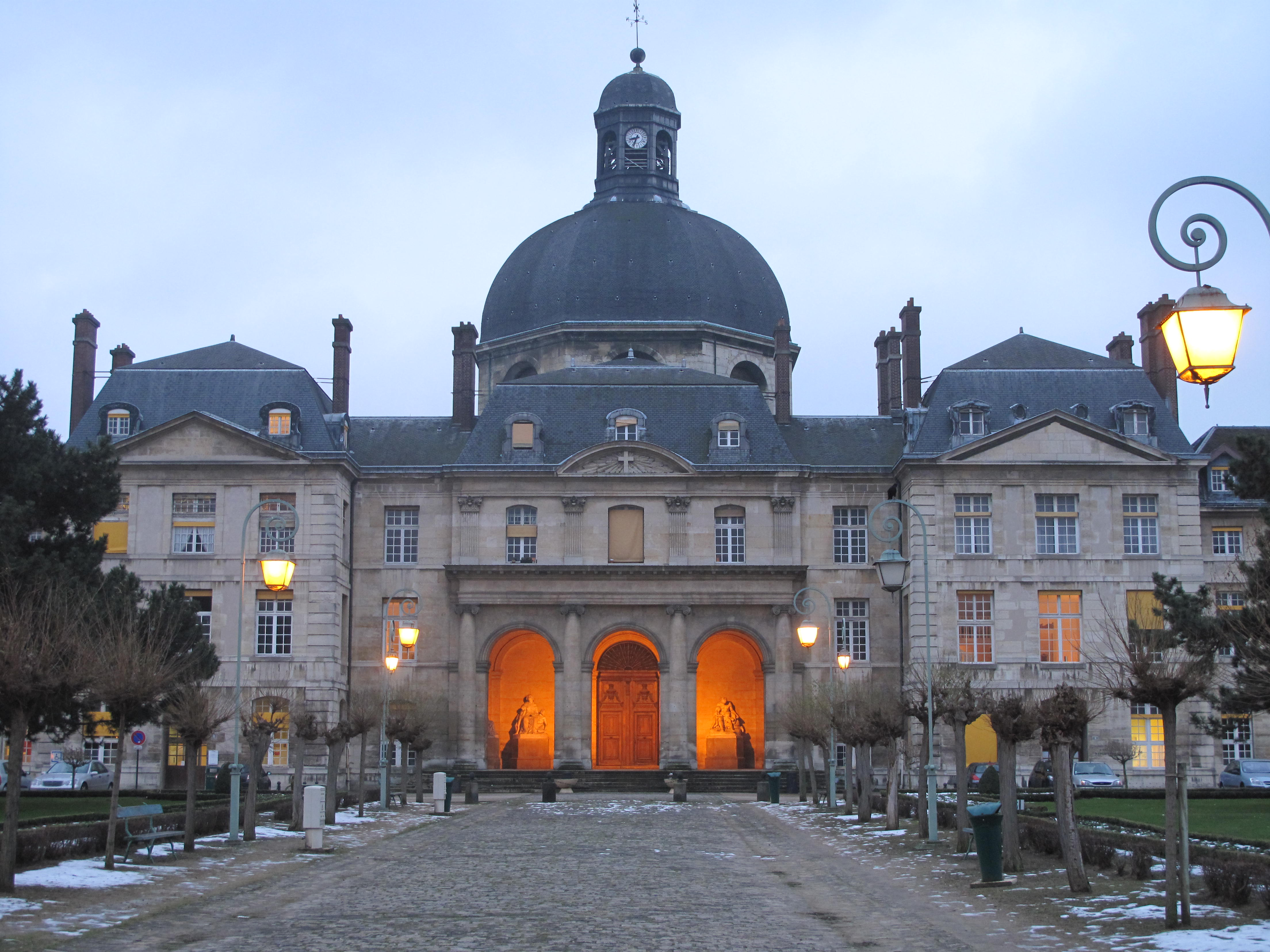
- Chapel Saint-Louis-de-la-Salpetriere

Religion
- Province: Archdiocese of Paris
- Rite: Roman Rite

Location
- Location: 13th arrondissement of Paris religious_affiliation = Catholic Church
- Interactive map of Chapel Saint-Louis-de-la-Salpetriere

Architecture
- Style: Neo-Gothic
- Groundbreaking: 1671
- Completed: 1678

The Chapel of Saint-Louis-de-la-Salpetriere is a Roman Catholic chapel located at 47 Boulevard de l'Hopital in the 13th arrondissement of Paris. It was largely built between 1671 and 1678 as part of a hospital complex started by King Louis XIV in 1656 to provide care for a flood of impoverished people coming into Paris. It was finally completed in 1756.

The Chapel is open every day between 9:00 am and 18:00.

== History ==
The site was originally occupied by a large group of buildings used by King Louis XIII to make gunpowder for cannon, which had been abandoned in 1650. The new complex created by Louis XIV eventually included a rudimentary hospital, an asylum for the mentally ill, a home for the elderly, an orphanage, a prison and the chapel.

The chapel was begun in 1670 by the royal architect Louis Le Vau, leading advocate of the French classical style. After the premature death of Le Vau in the same year, the chapel was built by the new royal architect, Liberal Bruant best-known for his design of Les Invalides. It was largely finished by 1678, but was not entirely completed until 1786. Cardinal Mazarin was a generous donor to the project.

Prior to 1795 the prisoners with mental health problems were treated as criminals and kept in chains. In that year, the psychiatrist Philippe Pinel had the psychiatric patients removed their chains, and treated as patients.

== Architecture ==
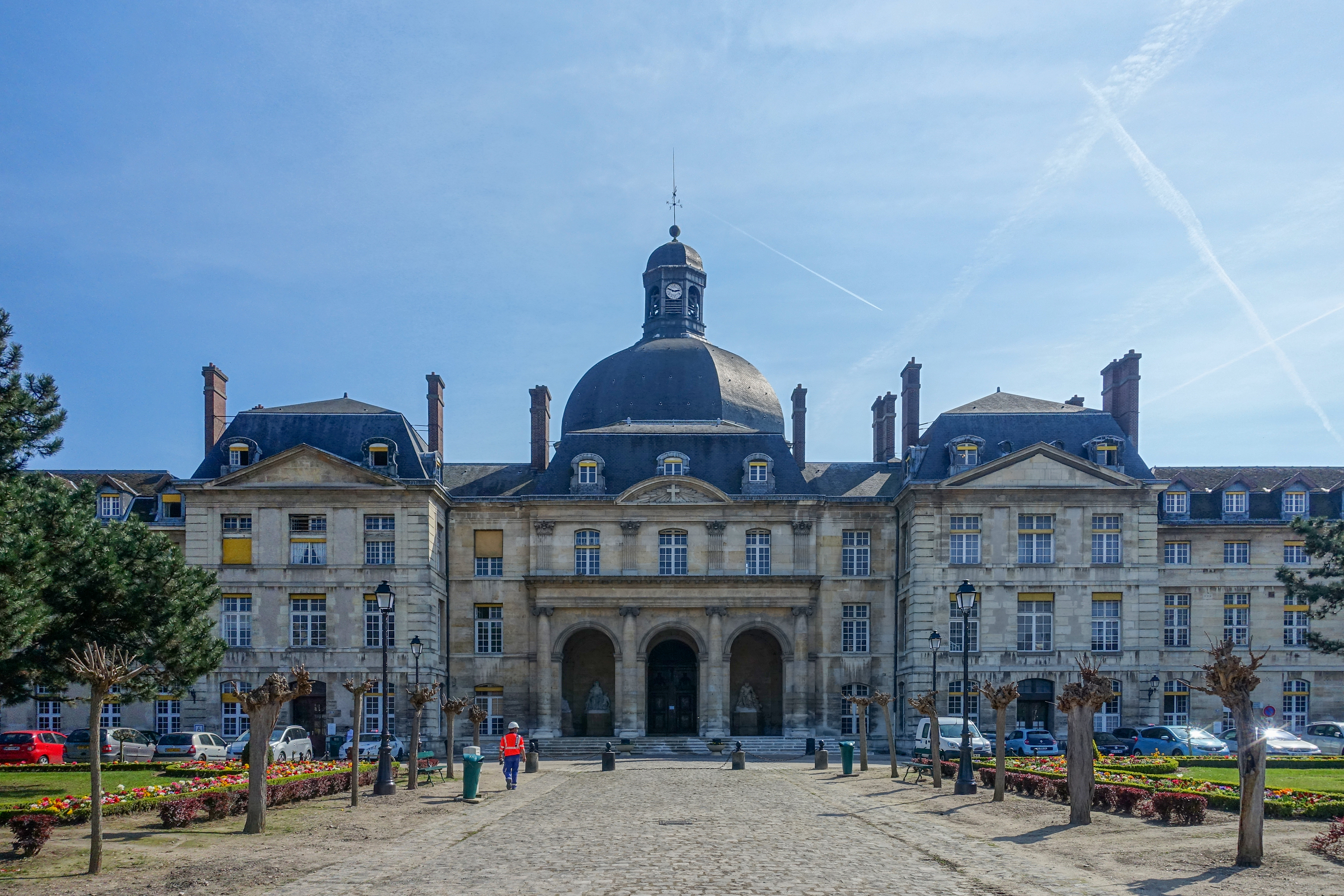
Chapel, between hospital wings

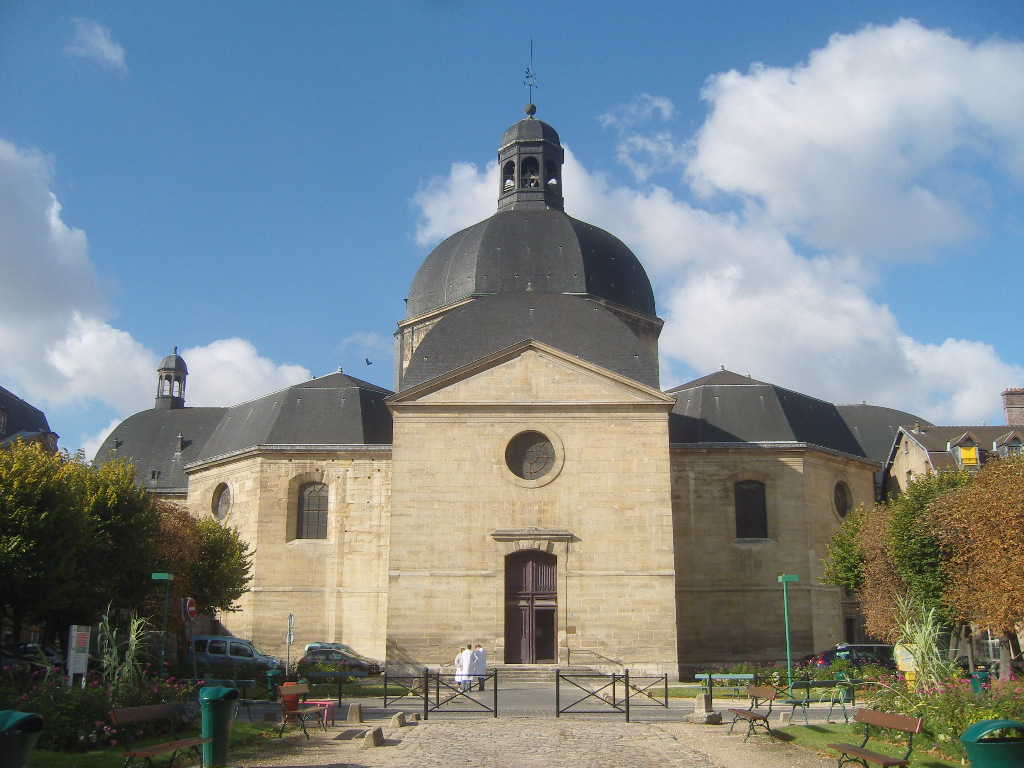
The nave, with adjacent chapels.

The octagonal dome, covered with tile and topped by a lantern, became a visible landmark in east Paris. Te facade has two levels; the ground level has a portico with three arcades separated by ionic columns. the level above has pilasters with Corinthian capitals and a curved fronton.

=== The porch - sculpture ===
The porch is decorated with two monumental sculptural groups created by Antoine Etex (1808-1888). The central and most famous group depicts "Cain struck by the Divine Anger", showing Cain, who had killed his brother Abel, being condemned to roam the world with his children forever. This sculpture, made when Etex was just thirty-five years old, brought him immediate fame at the Paris Salon of 1833. It also won him a commission to make two of the three primary sculptures of Arch of Triumph, then being planned.

The sculpture on the left side, made in 1852, depicts a scene based on the Paris Cholera epidmeic of 1853: "The City of Paris implores God for Mercy for The Victims of Cholera".

== The interior ==
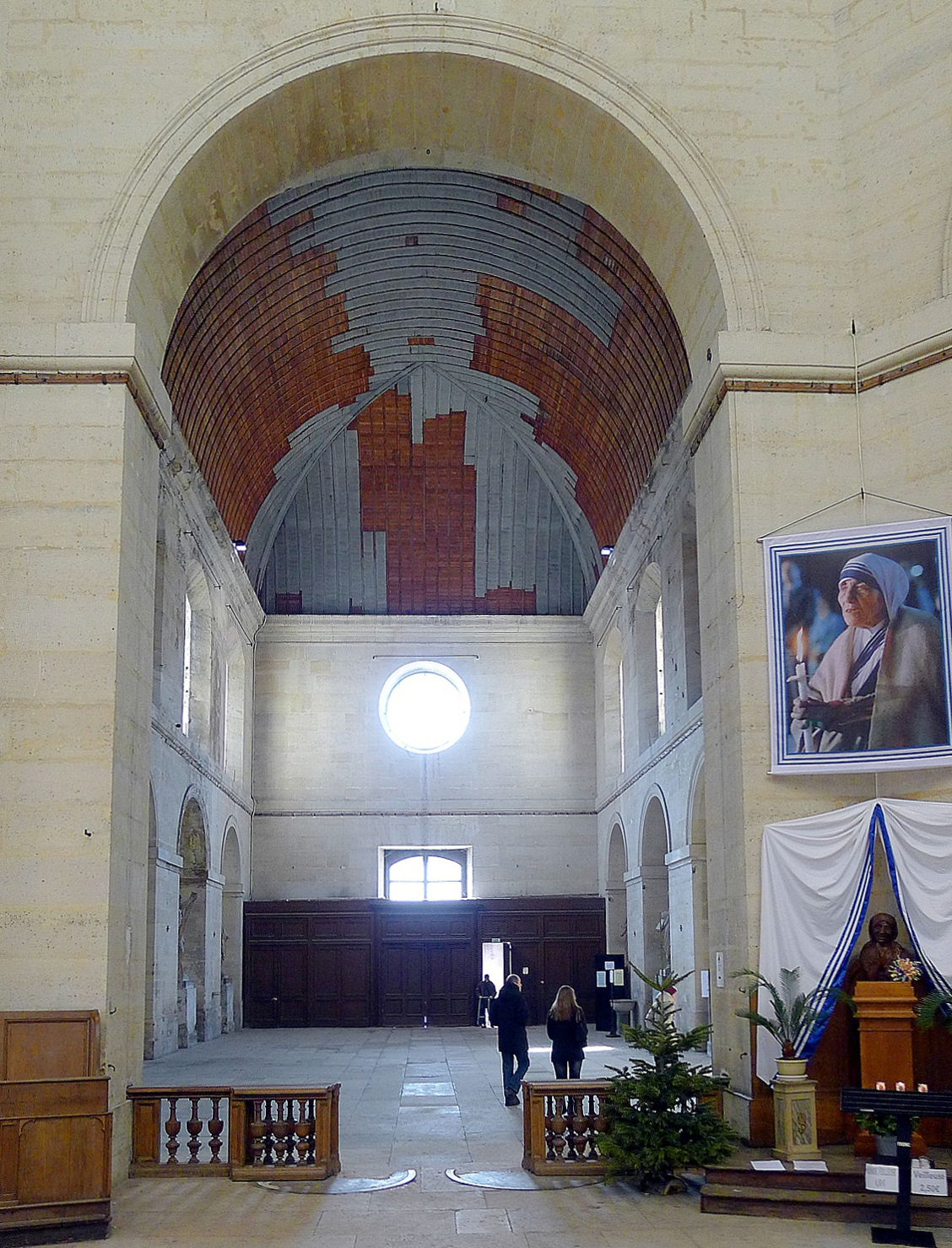
Entry Hall

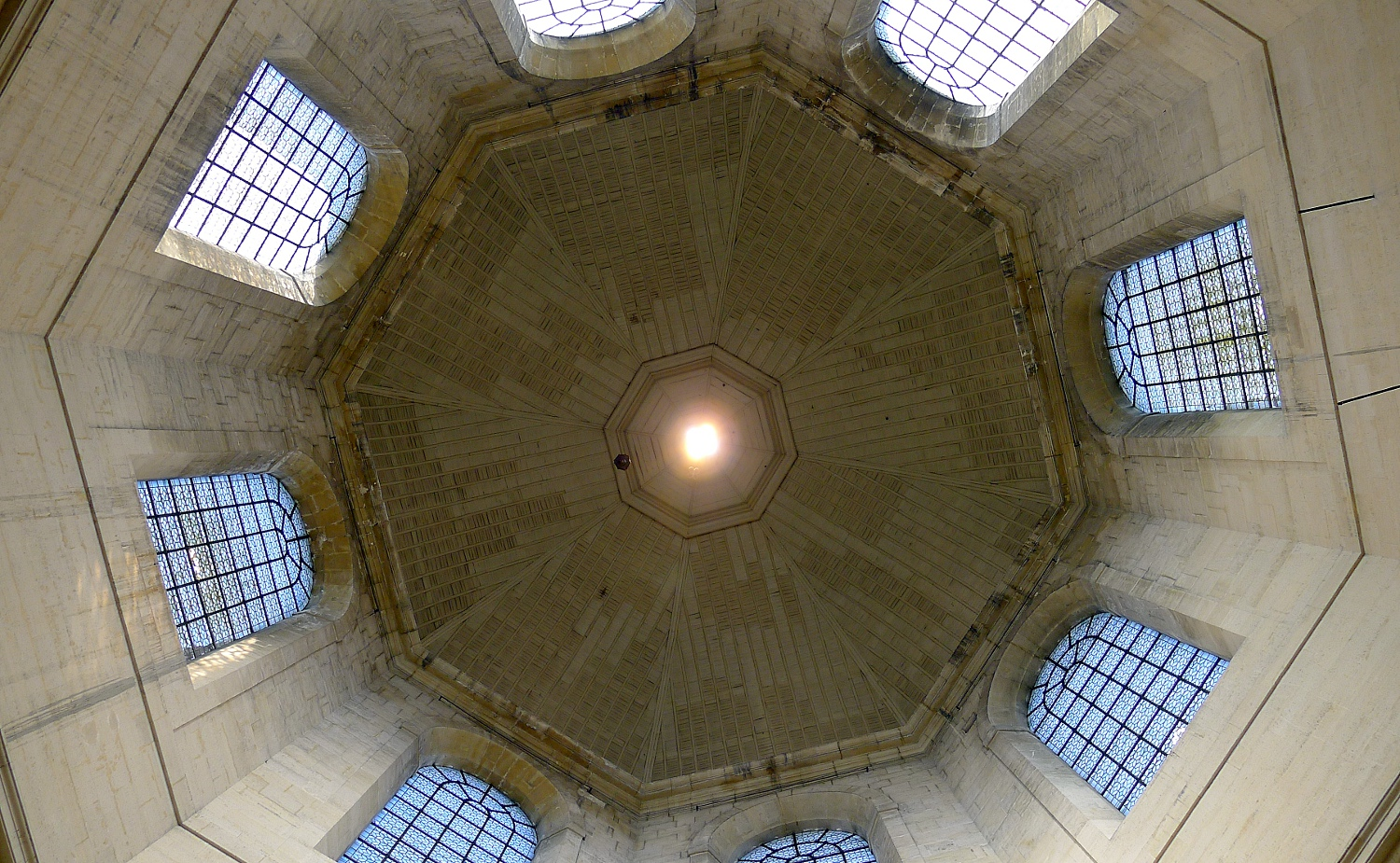
The cupola

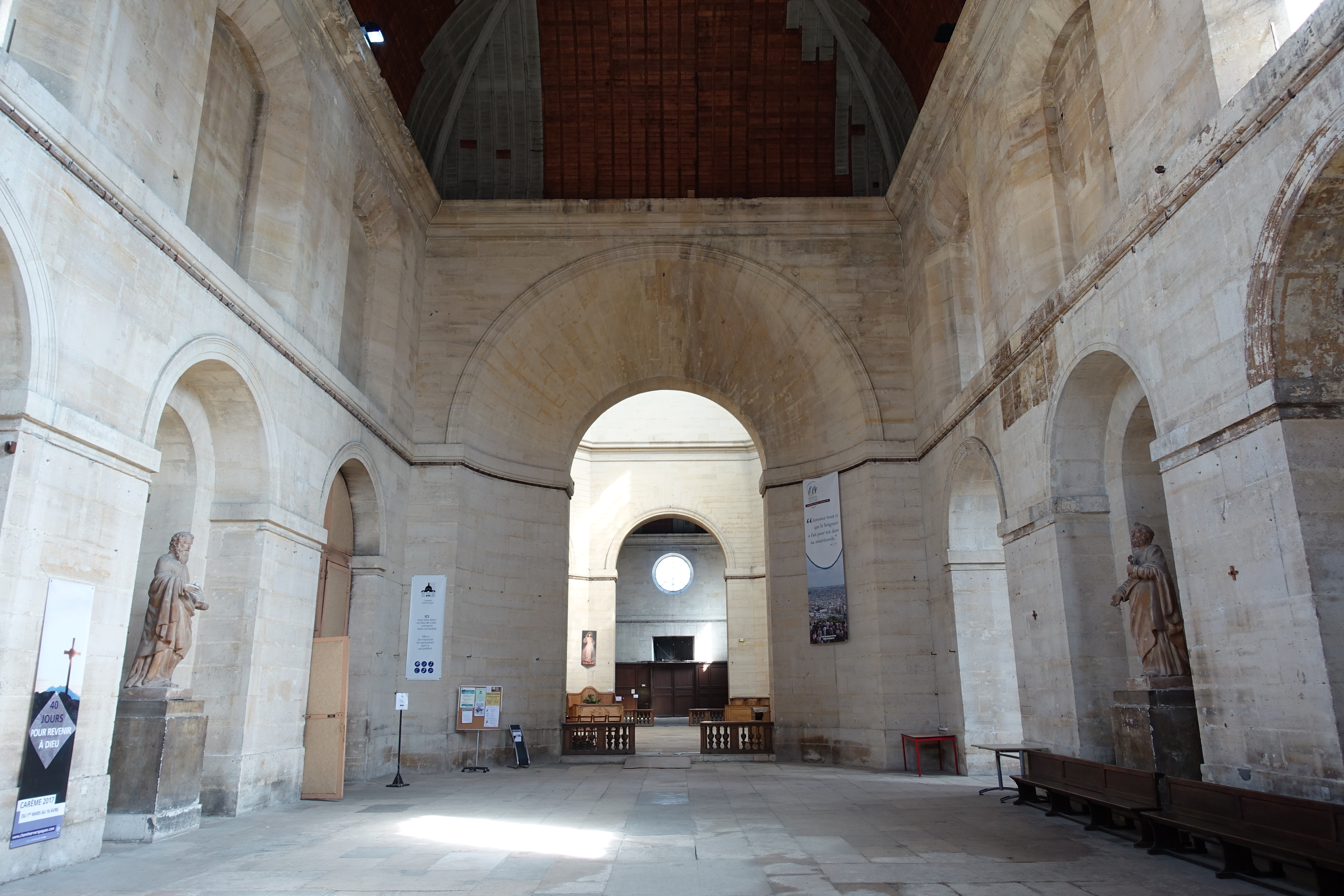
Interior beneath the cupola

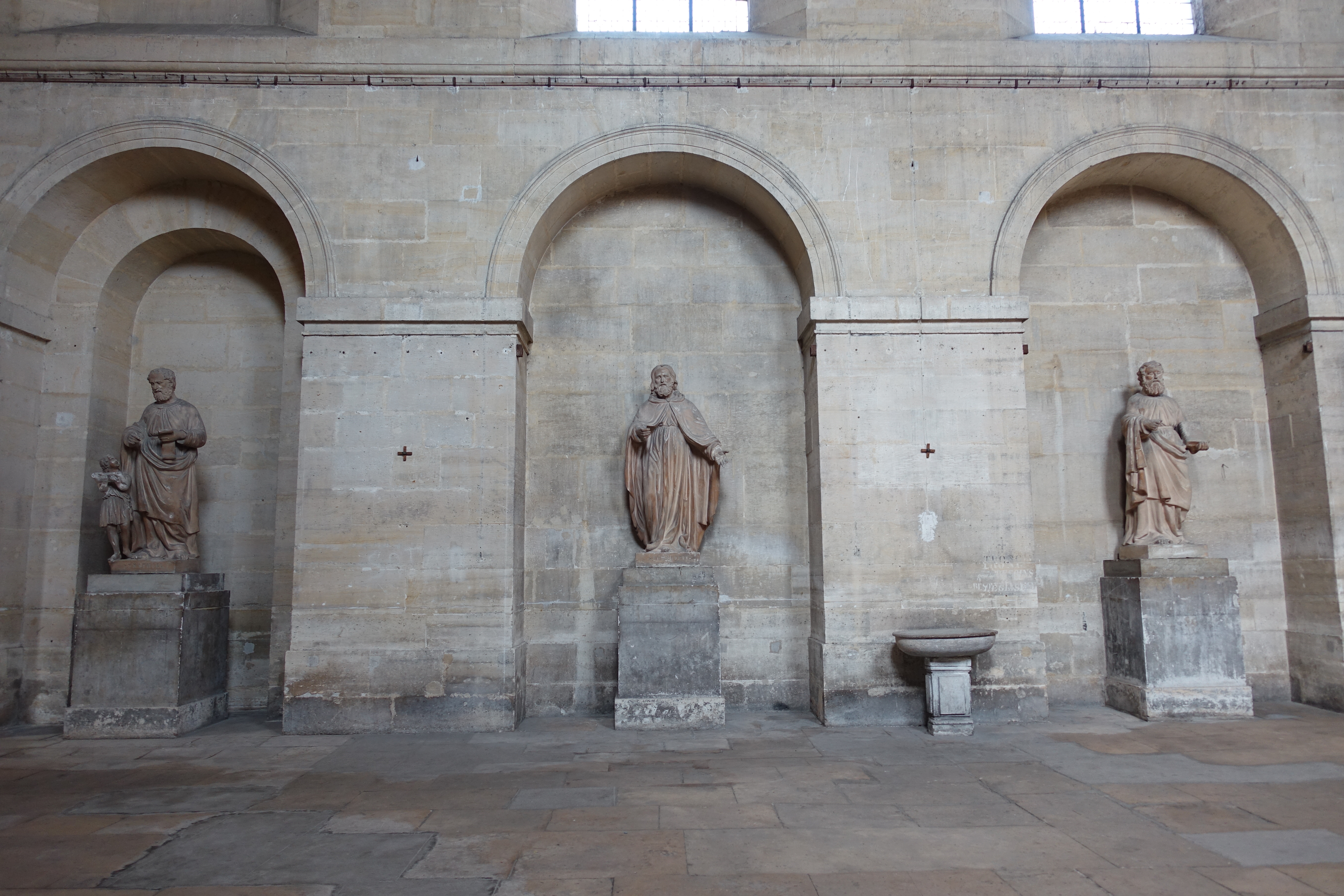
Statues of Saint Louis

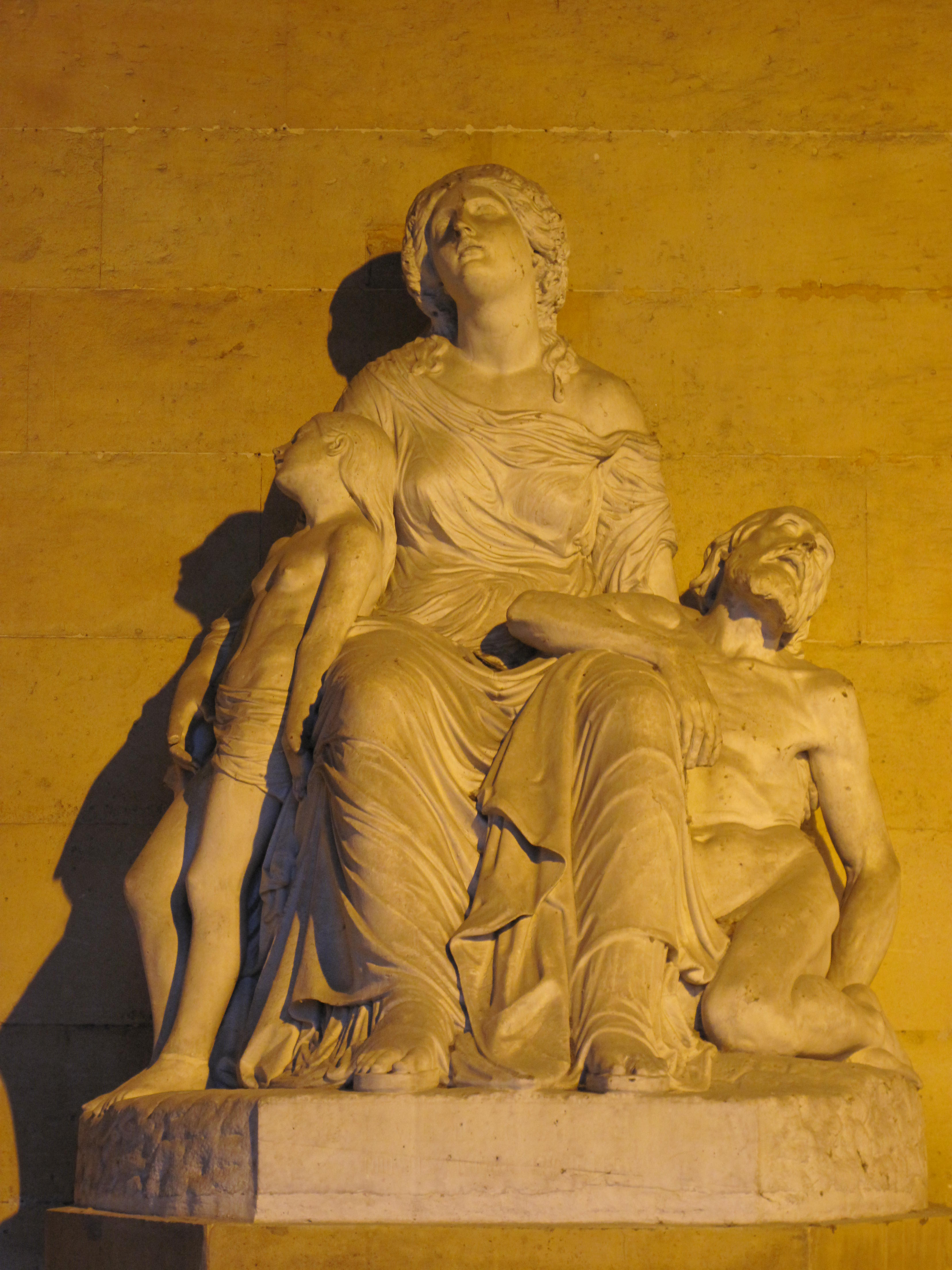
"Illness" statue

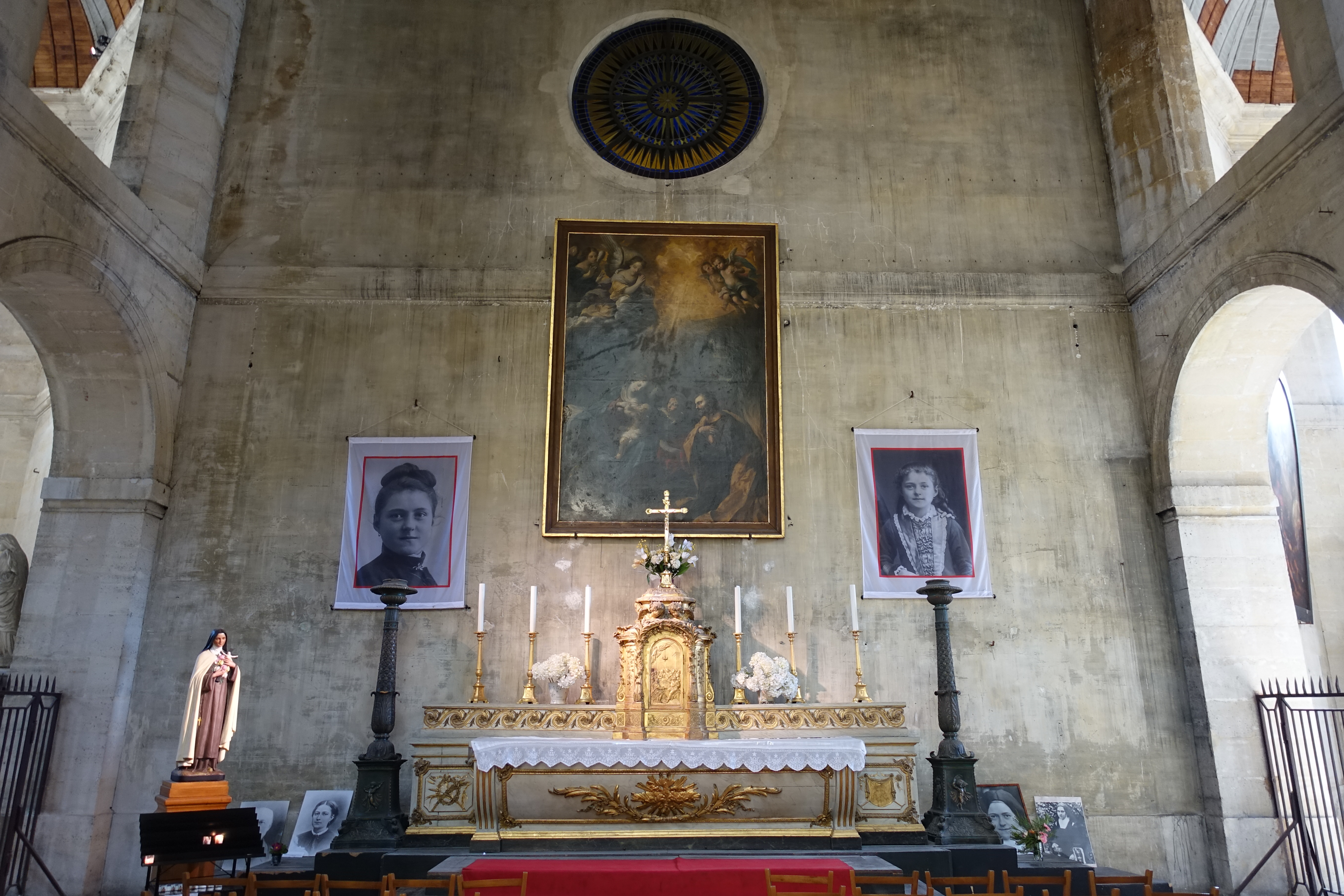
The main altar

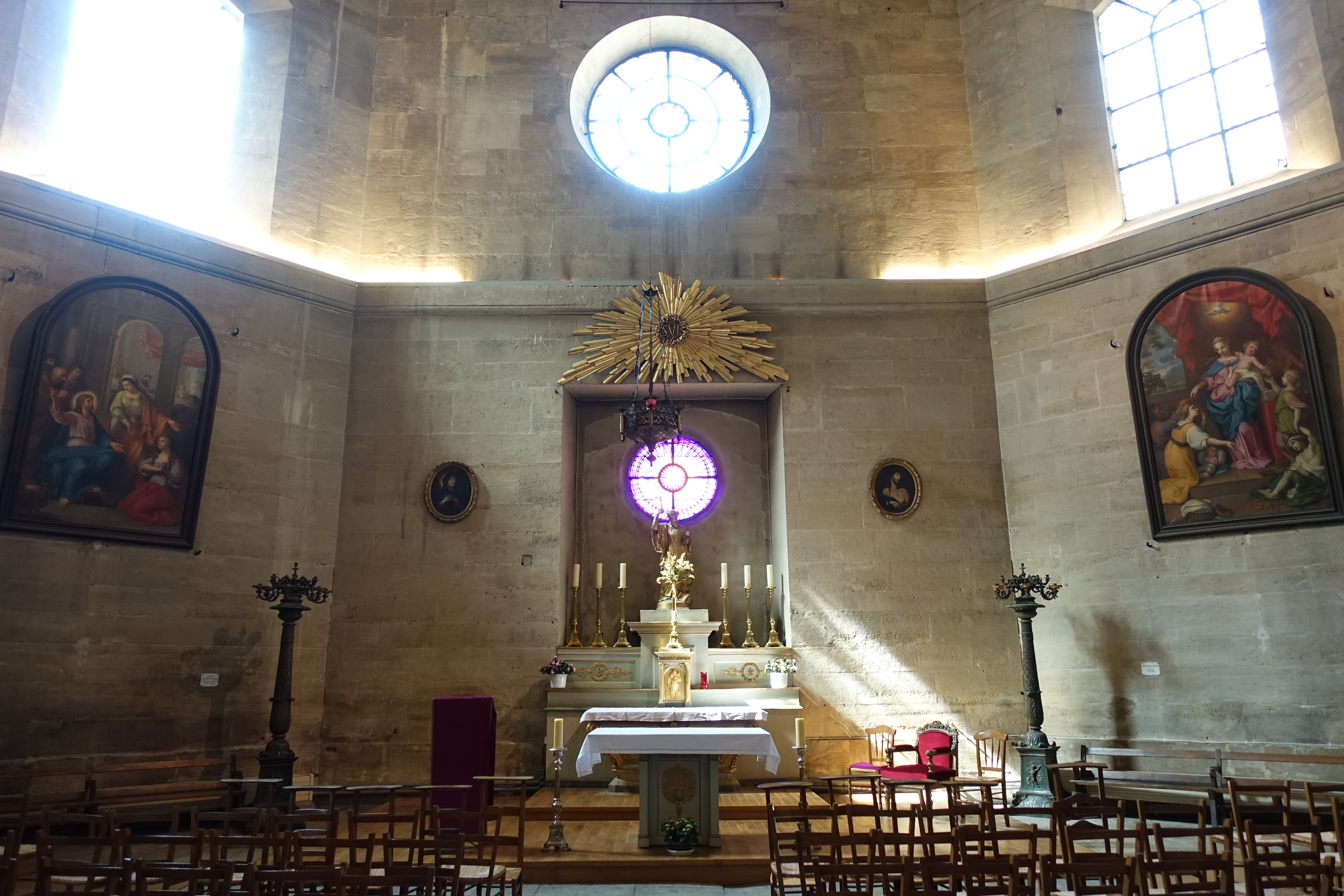
Altar of Chapel of Saint Vincent de Paul

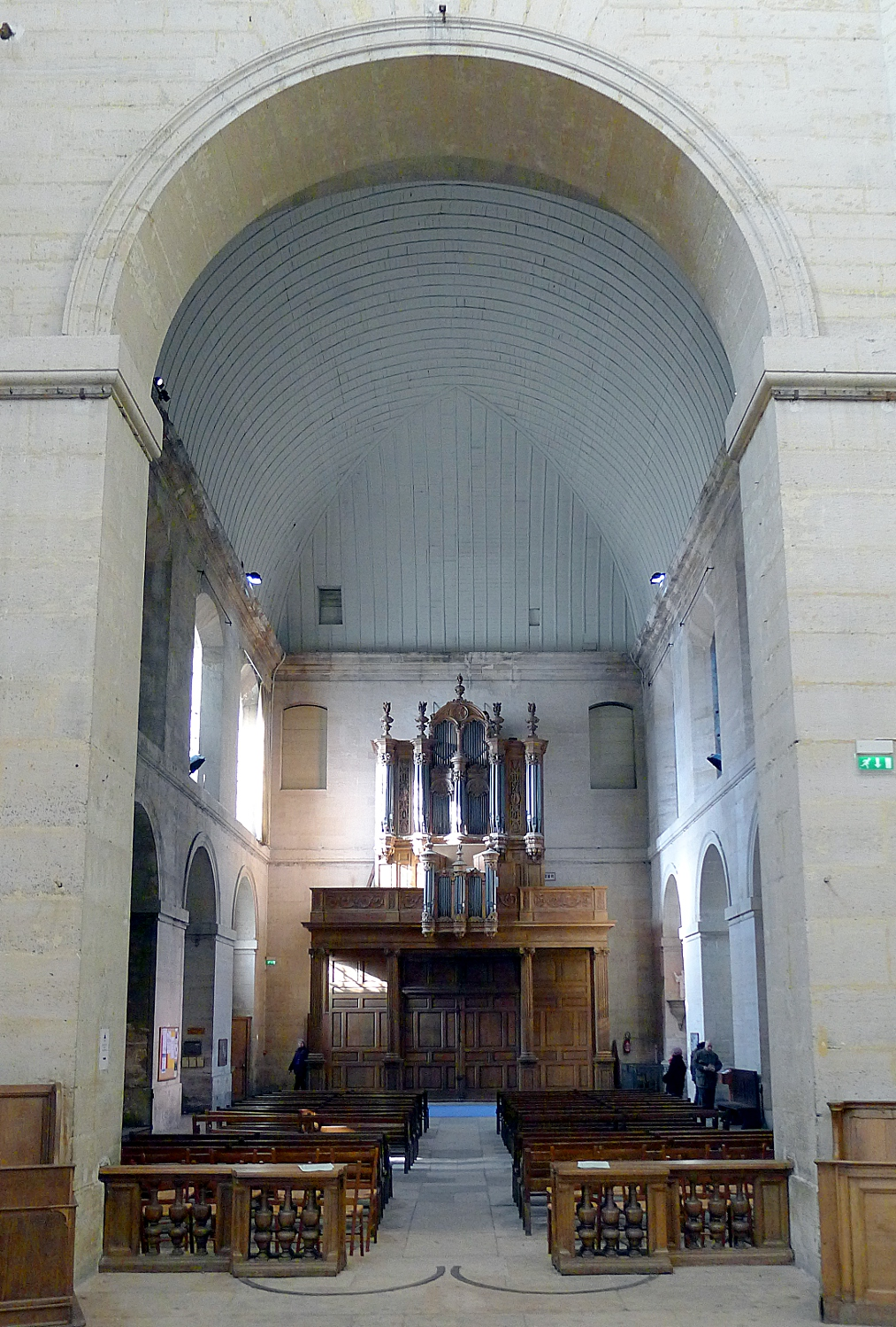
Chapel with organ

The interior is spacious and laid out in the form of a Greek cross. Four chapels of equal size were placed in the angles. each for a specific kind of patient; beggars and the impoverished were placed in one chapel, the blind in another, prostitutes in another, and the incurable in the fourth. In the center, under the cupola, was the choir, visible to those in all of the four chapels, The eight windows of the cupola had clear glass to let in more light.

The chapel has very little decoration, aside from a small number of statues and paintings, but some of the paintings are by notable French artists of the 18th and 19th century These include Jacques-Augustin-Catherine Pajou, the son of sculptor Augustin Pajou (1766-1828), and "Christ with Saint Mary and Martha", by the neo-classical artist Jean-Baptiste Lesueur (painter).

== The Organ ==
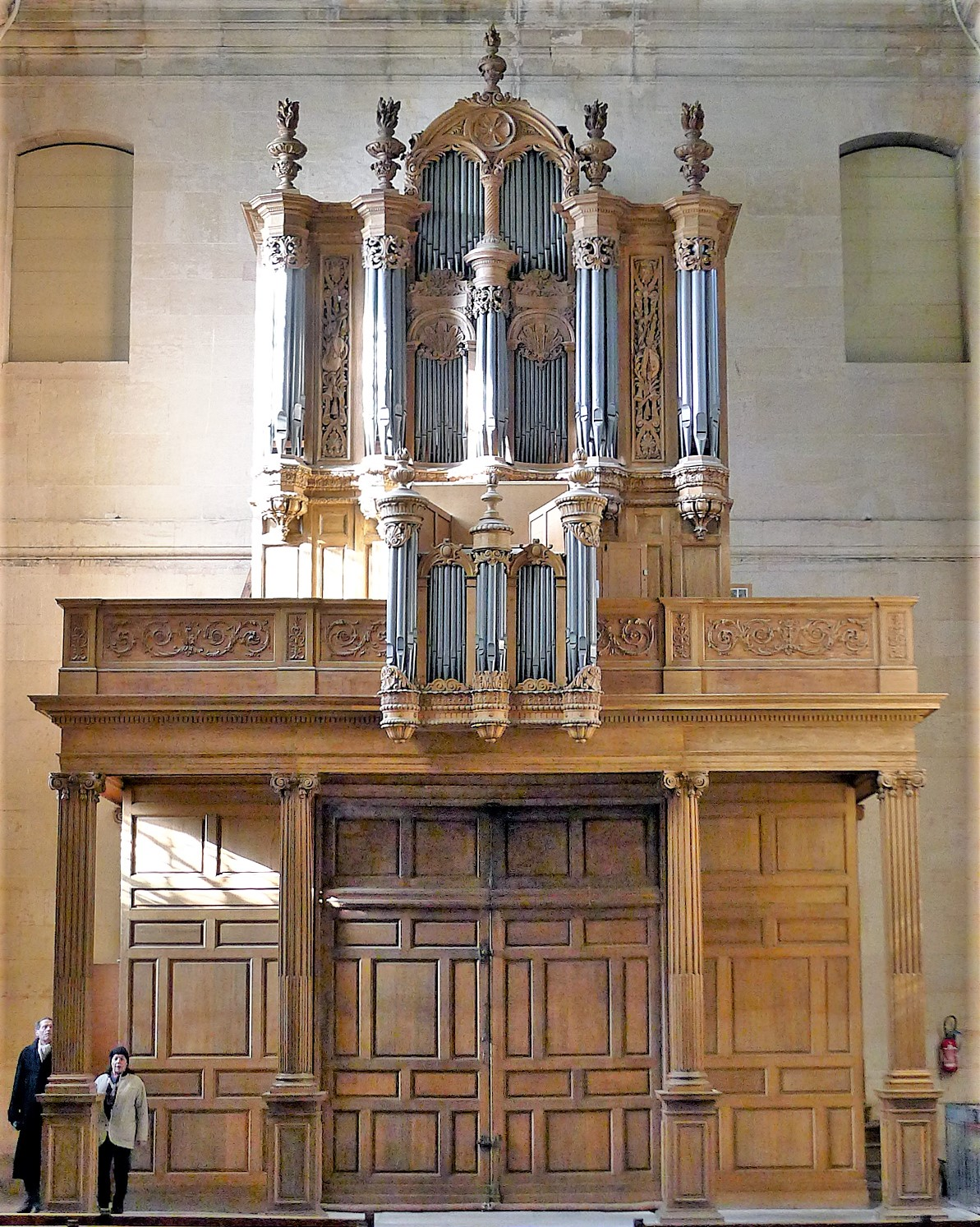
The organ over the portal

The case of the organ dates to the 18th-19 centuries. It contained an orgue Brieu (1789), Suret (1861) and Muller (1975) It has three keyboards and transmission to thirty-one mechanical effects.
