= Protestant Redemption Church, Paris =

Lutheran church in Paris, France

Protestant Redemption Church
- Église évangélique de la Rédemption (French)
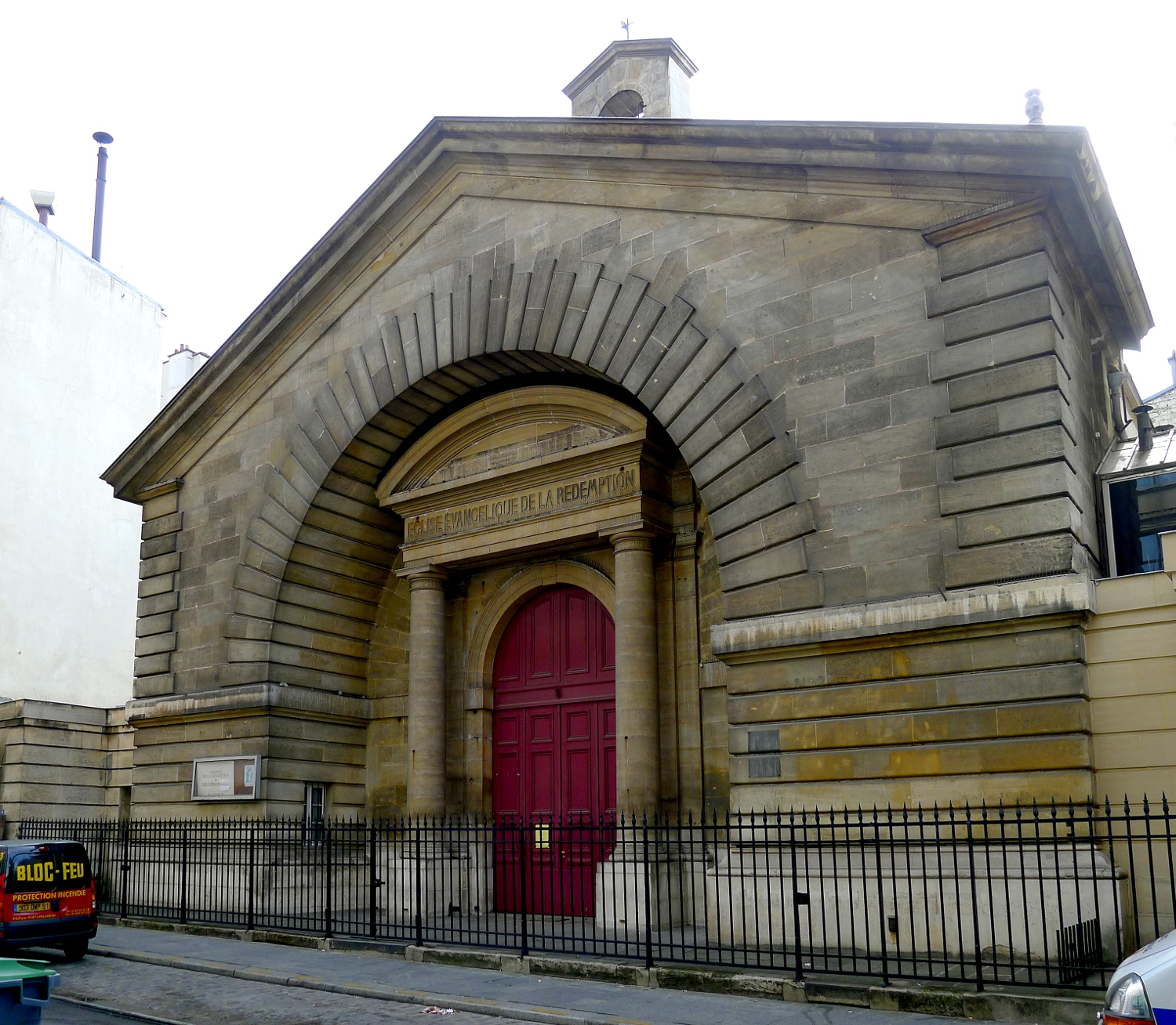

- Location within Paris
- 48°52′25.65″N 2°20′23.01″E
- Type: Lutheran church
- Location: 9th arrondissement of Paris

History
- Built: 1821–1825; 1843

Site notes
- Architect(s): Louis-Adrien Lusson; Franz Christian Gau; Théodore Ballu

Monument historique
- Official name: Temple de la Rédemption
- Designated: June 21st, 1958
- Reference no.: PA00089002

The Protestant Redemption Church (French: église évangélique de la Rédemption), also named the Redemption Temple (Temple de la Rédemption) or simply La Rédemption, is a Lutheran parish in the 9th arrondissement of Paris, France. It is affiliated with the United Protestant Church of France.

== History ==
The church was established in a former 90-meter-long unloading hall built between 1821 and 1825 by architect Louis-Adrien Lusson. Later it was moved to another building at Quai de Jemmapes.

In 1837, Protestant Princess Helene of Mecklenburg-Schwerin married King Louis Philippe I's son Ferdinand Philippe at the Redemption Church. She was a co-founder of the church which she attended regularly. Between 1841 and 1843, German architect Franz Christian Gau made extensive alterations to the building while keeping its four bays. After Gau's death, the works were ended by Théodore Ballu.

In 1873, Paul Gauguin married a young Dane, Mette-Sophie Gad (1850–1920), at the Redemption Temple. The funeral of Baron Georges-Eugène Haussmann took place on January 15, 1891, in the church. Haussmann was a regular parishioner of the Redemption Church.

The building was listed as a Historic Monument on February 21, 1958.

The temple has an organ.

== See also ==
- List of churches in Paris
- Protestantism in Paris
- Protestantism in France
- United Protestant Church of France

== Bibliography ==
- Guicharnaud, Hélène; Guttinger-Mettetal, Christiane (2013). Temples réformés et églises luthériennes de Paris (in French). La Voix Protestante. pp. 62–65.
- Gourlier, Charles; Biet, J.-E.; Grillon, Edme; Tardieu, Eugène (1844). Choix d'édifices publics projetés et construits en France depuis le commencement du XIXe siècle (in French). Vol. 3. Paris: Librairie Louis Colas. p. 8 (online) and planche 161 (online).
- Pérouse de Montclos, Jean-Marie, ed. (1994). Le guide du patrimoine Paris (in French). Paris: Hachette. p. 164. ISBN 978-2-01-0168123.
