= Renaud de Vilbac =

French organist and composer (1829 - 1884)

- Born: Alphonse Zoé Charles Renaud de Vilbac; 3 June 1829; Montpellier, France
- Died: 19 March 1884 (aged 54); Ixelles, Belgium
- Occupations: Organist; composer

Alphonse Zoé Charles Renaud de Vilbac (3 June 1829 – 19 March 1884) was a prolific French organist and composer.

== Biography ==
Vilbac entered the Conservatoire de Paris at age 13 to study the pipe organ with François Benoist and composition with Fromental Halévy. Two years later, in 1844, he won the second "Prix de Rome" with his cantata Le Renégat de Tanger on a text by Claude-Emmanuel de Pastoret.

Returning to Paris after his stay at the Villa Medici in Rome, Vilbac became the holder of the great organ Merklin-Schütz of the église Saint-Eugène-Sainte-Cécile in 1855.

== Works ==
=== Lyrical works ===
- 1857: Au clair de lune, operetta on a libretto by Antoine de Léris, at the Théâtre des Bouffes-Parisiens.
- 1858: Don Almanzor, opéra bouffe on a libretto by Eugène Labat and Louis Ulbach, at the Théâtre Lyrique.

=== Music for piano ===
- Menuet Louis XV, Op. 31
- Ophélia, nocturne
- Petite fantaisie sur la mélodie de Tissot
- Lili-Polka
- Petite poupée chérie, waltz
- Caresses enfantines, mazurka
- Echo du désert, rêverie arabe
- Sonnez clairons, military march
- Caprice Styrien
- Fior di speranza, romance sans paroles
- École complète et progressive du piano, in 7 volumes (Paris: Choudens, c.1871)
- Les Arabesques, Op. 32 (Paris: Heugel, 1871)
- La Neige, mazurka russe (Paris: Léon Grus, c.1871)
- Échos de l'enfance, 12 esquisses musicales (Paris: Enoch, c.1877)
- 1re Polonaise (Paris: Enoch, c.1877)
- Deuxième styrienne (Paris: Enoch, 1879)
- Fantaisie sur I Capuleti e i Montecchi by Bellini (Braunschweig: Litolff)
- Fantaisie sur Norma by Bellini (Braunschweig: Litolff)
- Potpourri sur Coppélia (ballet by Léo Delibes), for piano 4 hands (Berlin: A. Fürstner)
- Beautés de Coppélia (ballet by Léo Delibes), 2 suites for piano 4 hands (c.1885)
- Bouquet de mélodies sur La Mascotte, opéra comique by Edmond Audran, 2 suites for piano 4 hands (c.1881)

=== Music for organ and harmonium ===
- Perles de l'harmonium, 80 Transcriptions of classical pieces (Braunschweig: Litolff, c.1875)
- L'Orgue moderne, twelve pieces applicable to harmoniums, small and large organs, in 2 series (Paris: Heugel, c.1868)
- L’Organiste Catholique, in 3 vols. (London, Boston, New York, Milan and Paris: Litolff)
  - Vol. 1: 12 Offertoires, 12 Élévations ou Communions et 12 Sorties
  - Vol. 2: Antiennes, Versets, Marches, Processions, Préludes
  - Vol. 3: 12 Offertoires originaux pour les principales fêtes de l'année
