= Louis-Adrien Lusson =

French architect

Louis-Adrien Lusson (1788–1864) was a French architect. His projects in Paris include the churches of Saint-Eugène at 6 rue Sainte-Cécile, 9th arrondissement (1855), and Saint-François Xavier des Missions étrangères (1861–63). He was born in La Flèche and died in Rome.

== Biography ==
The son of a stonemason from La Flèche, Adrien-Louis Lusson was introduced to construction at a very young age. At the age of 18, he took part in the restoration of the facades of the Château de la Barbée in Bazouges-sur-le-Loir, near La Flèche. A student at the École des Beaux-Arts in Paris, he took classes with Lahure, Charles Percier, and Pierre-François-Léonard Fontaine. He became a road inspector for the city of Paris. He worked as an architect for the Octroi department from 1820 to 1830 and became the city of Paris's public works architect in 1835.

A-L Lusson designed the customs house on Rue Chauchat in Paris (1821-1825). Since 1843, the building has been occupied by the Protestant Redemption Church, Paris.

In 1855, he built the Church of Saint-Eugène-Sainte-Cécile in Paris with architect Louis-Auguste Boileau.

In 1861, he designed the Church of Saint-François-Xavier des Missions Étrangères, also located in Paris. That same year, he also submitted a proposal for the construction of the Palais Garnier.

He was responsible for decorating the theater hall in La Flèche in the Sarthe region, as well as its dome.

He died in Rome in 1864 and was buried in the Père-Lachaise Cemetery (41st division).
