= Saint-Eugène-Sainte-Cécile =

Roman Catholic church in Paris, France

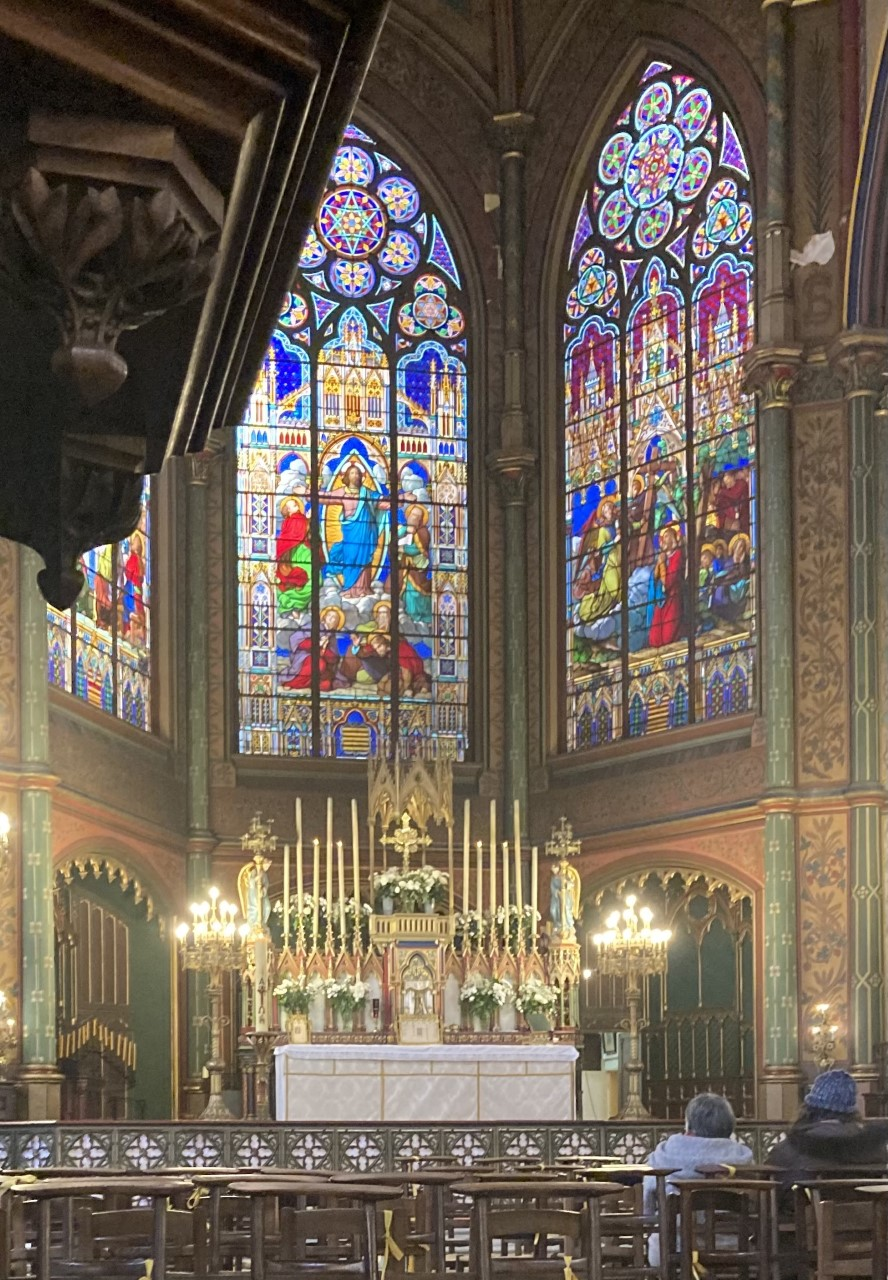
- Saint-Eugene-Sainte-Cécile

Religion
- Affiliation: Catholic Church
- Province: Archdiocese of Paris
- Rite: Roman Rite
- Status: Active

Location
- Location: 6 rue Sainte-Cécile, 9th arrondissement of Paris
- Interactive map of Saint-Eugène-Sainte-Cécile

Architecture
- Architects: Louis-Adrien Lusson, Louis-Auguste Boileau
- Style: Neo-Gothic and Second Empire Style
- Groundbreaking: 1854
- Completed: 1858

Website
- Website of the church

Église Saint-Eugène-Sainte-Cécile is a Roman Catholic church located at 6 rue Sainte-Cécile in the 9th arrondissement of Paris. In 1983 it was designated as a monument historique in its entirety. Designed in the Neo-Gothic style by Louis-Auguste Boileau and Louis-Adrien Lusson, the church was the first in France to use an entirely iron-framed construction. The first stone was laid in 1854, and the building was completed in 1855.

While the exterior of the church is rather plain and lacking in decoration, the interior is spacious, due to the iron framework, highly decorated, and filled with colour from a remarkable group of stained glass windows. In 1983 the entire church was designated as French historical monument.

Saint-Eugène's liturgy each Sunday includes both a traditional mass, and a Solemn High Mass sung in Latin.

== History ==
The parish of Saint-Eugène was created in 1854 to serve the growing population of the Faubourg Poissonnière district, at the time considered a suburb of Paris. The parish was entrusted to Abbé Coquand. The abbé helped finance the construction of the parish church on a piece of land which he owned. He specified that the style should reflect that of the 13th century, a time in the history of Christianity idealised by the 19th-century French Romantic movement. In order to minimize the cost of construction and maximize the interior space on the relatively small site, the abbé also suggested an iron-framed construction, which had hitherto only been used for industrial buildings.

Louis-Adrien Lusson had been originally commissioned to design the building. It was subsequently entrusted to Louis-Auguste Boileau, although Lusson remained involved in the design of its interior. Boileau had previously written a treatise on monumental architecture in which he championed the use of iron frame construction. The church was completed in 20 months. The first stone was laid in June 1854 and the building was inaugurated at Christmas 1855. It was dedicated to Saint Eugène de Deuil-la-Barre, a companion of Saint Denis of Paris, who was martyred by the Romans in the 3rd century. It also honoured Empress Eugènie, (who had recently married Napoleon III) who was a patroness of the church. Although the church remains dedicated solely to Saint Eugène, in the 20th century the name of Saint Cecilia, the patron saint of musicians, was added to reflect the church's proximity to the Paris Conservatory.

The church's design and iron frame construction provoked a controversy which was played out on the pages of the Journal des Debats in 1856 with Viollet-le-Duc accusing Boileau of being a mechanic rather than an architect and describing the church's Neo-Gothic design as a "pastiche of bad taste".

The church has no bell tower in order not to disturb the musicians studying at the Paris Conservatory.

== Exterior ==
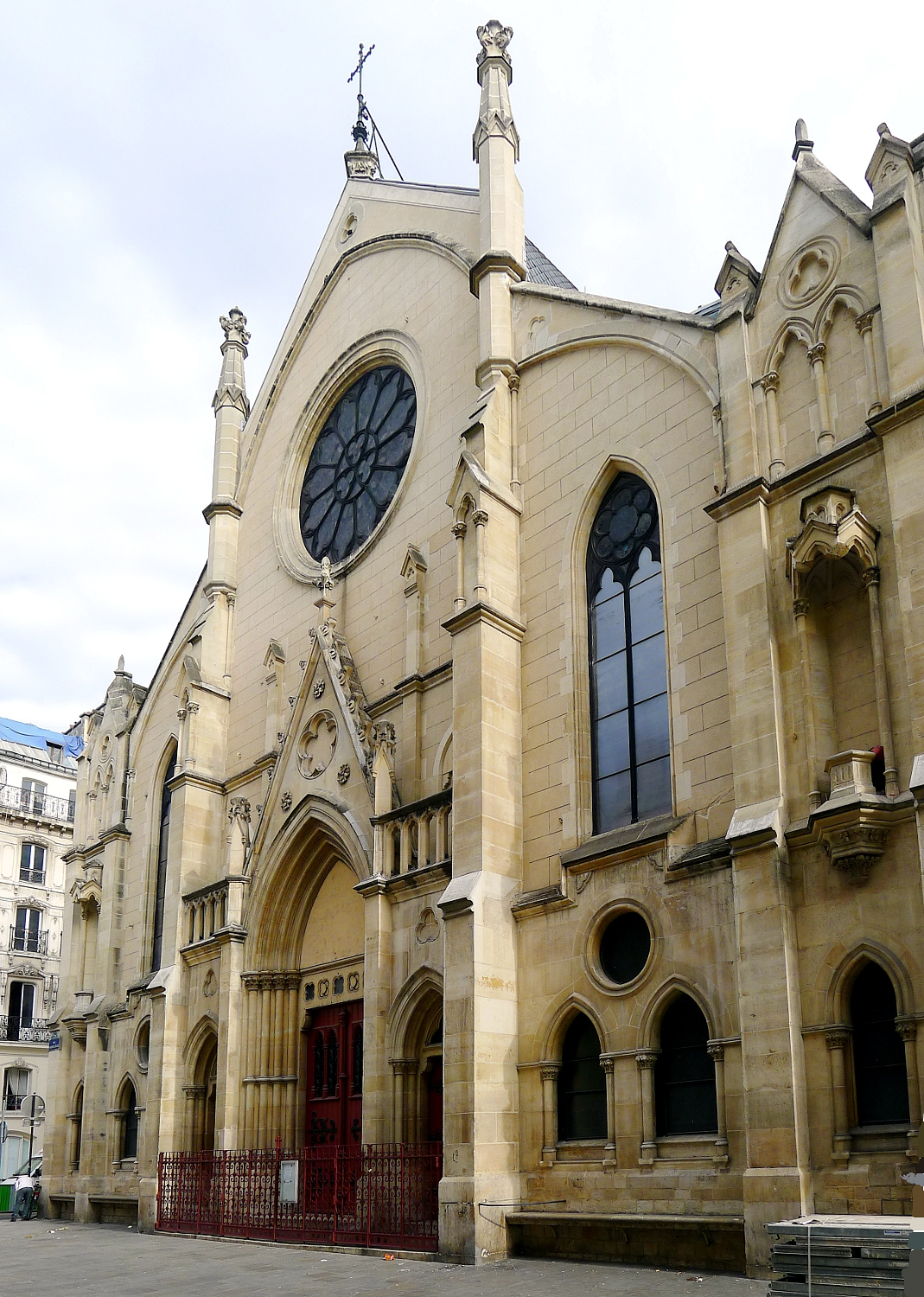

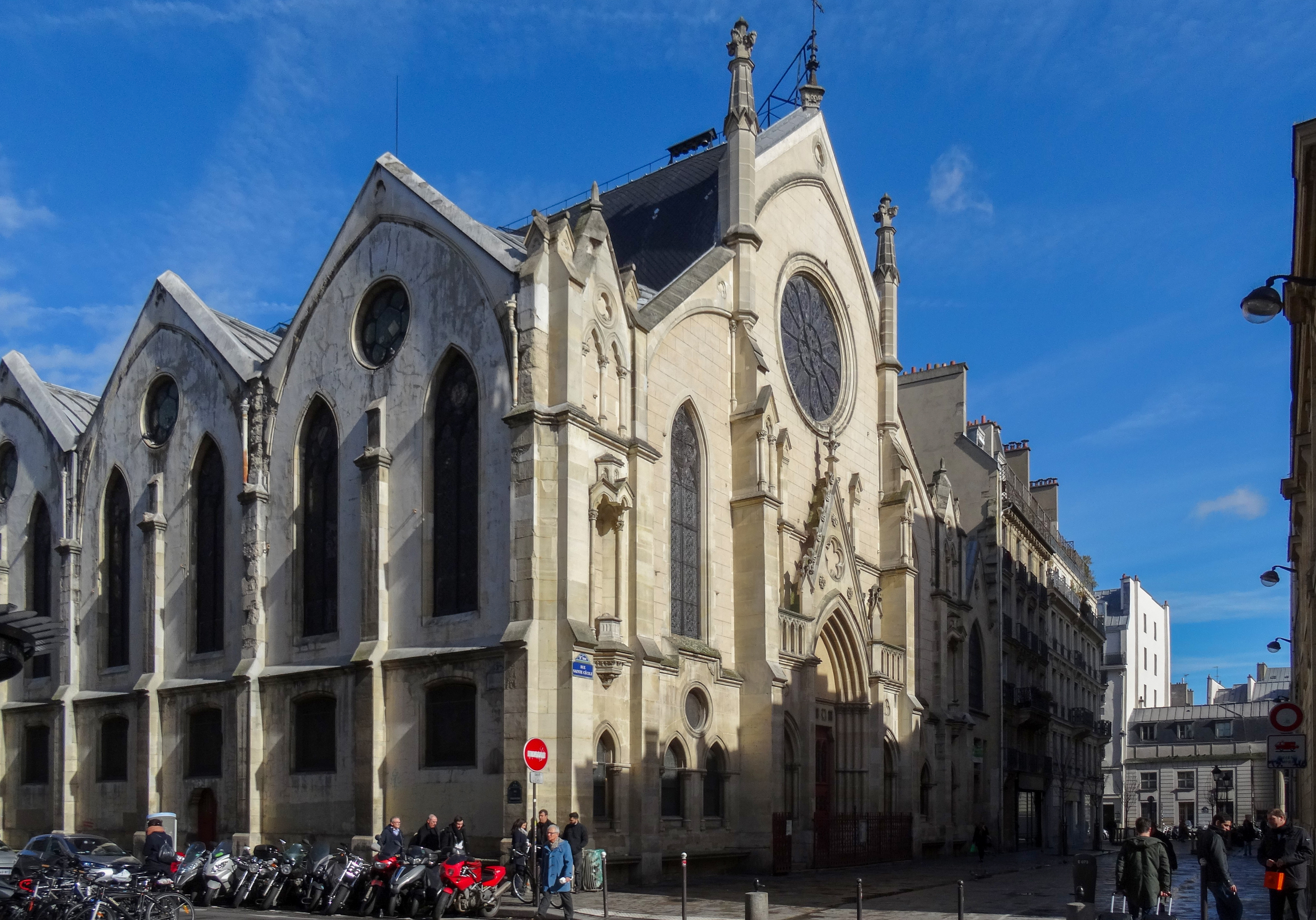
Exterior of the church on rue Sainte Cecile

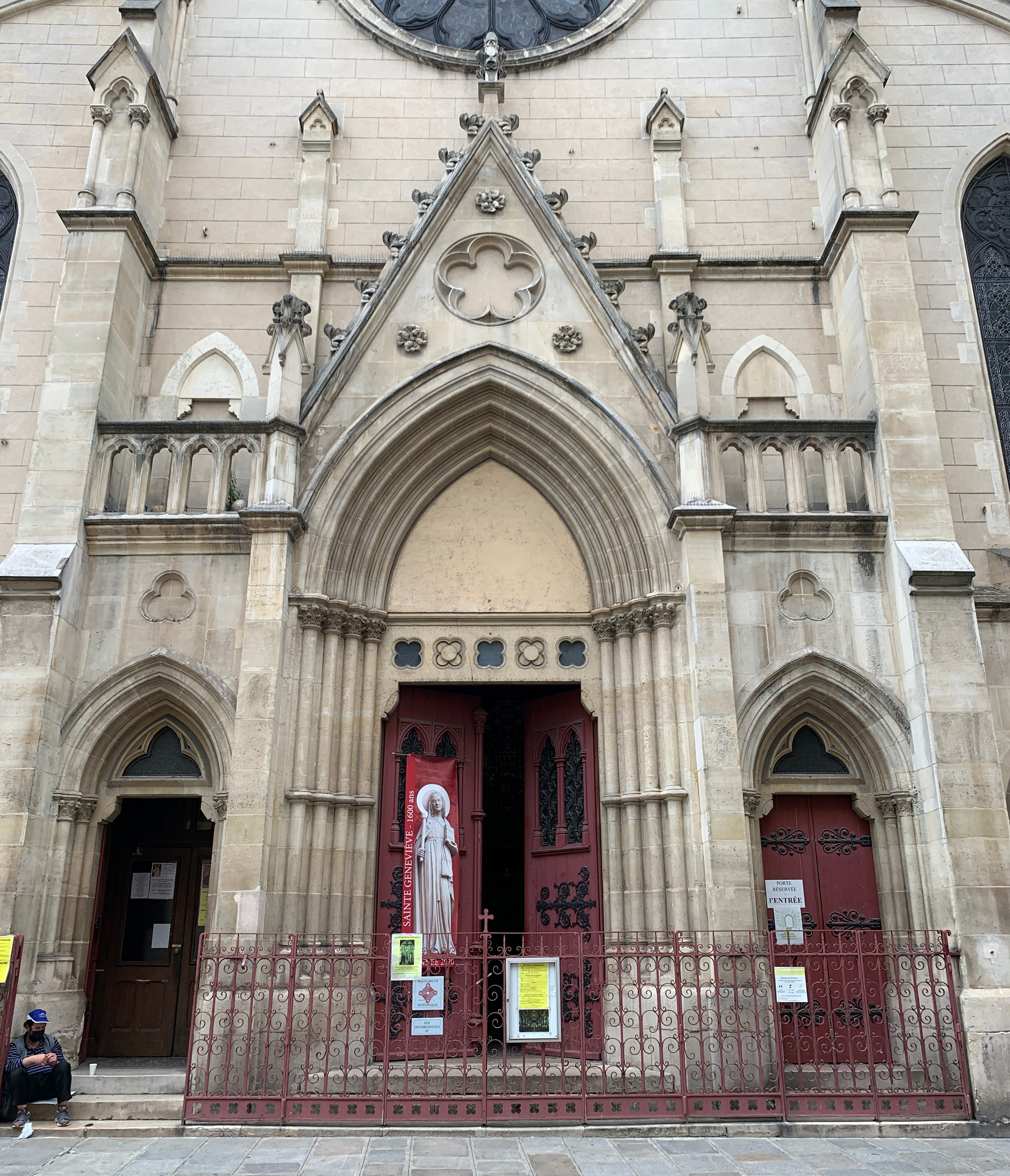
Portal of the church

The church is located on a street corner, and exterior of the church is extremely modest. The decoration consists of a mixture of traditional elements from Gothic architecture, including triangular gables, a rose window, and a tympanum over the portal with decorative leaf-shaped crockets along the edges. However, the niches have no statues, and the facade is very plain. The buttresses are purely decorative, since the building has an iron frame.

== Interior ==
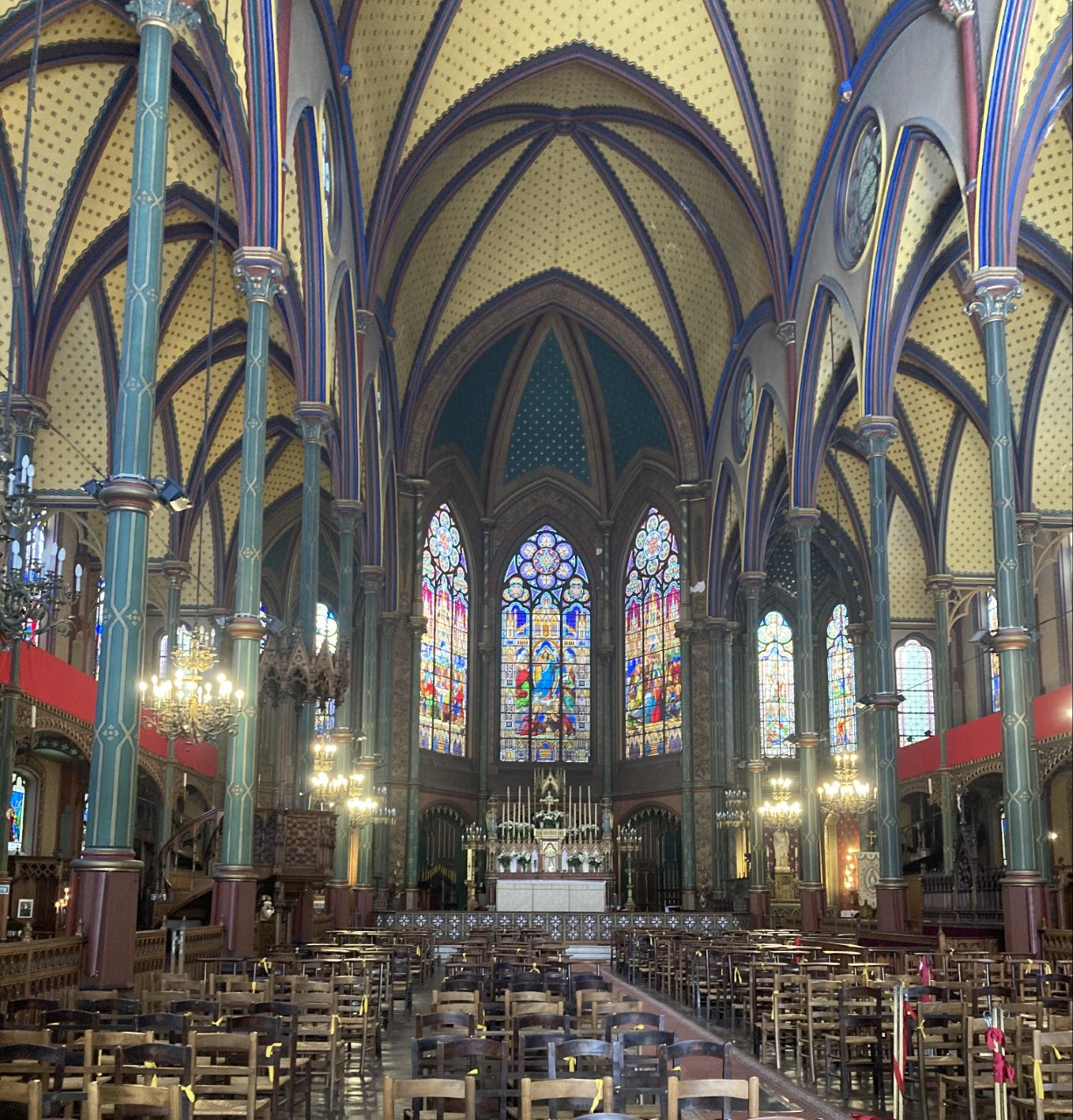
Nave facing the choir, lined with cast-iron columns

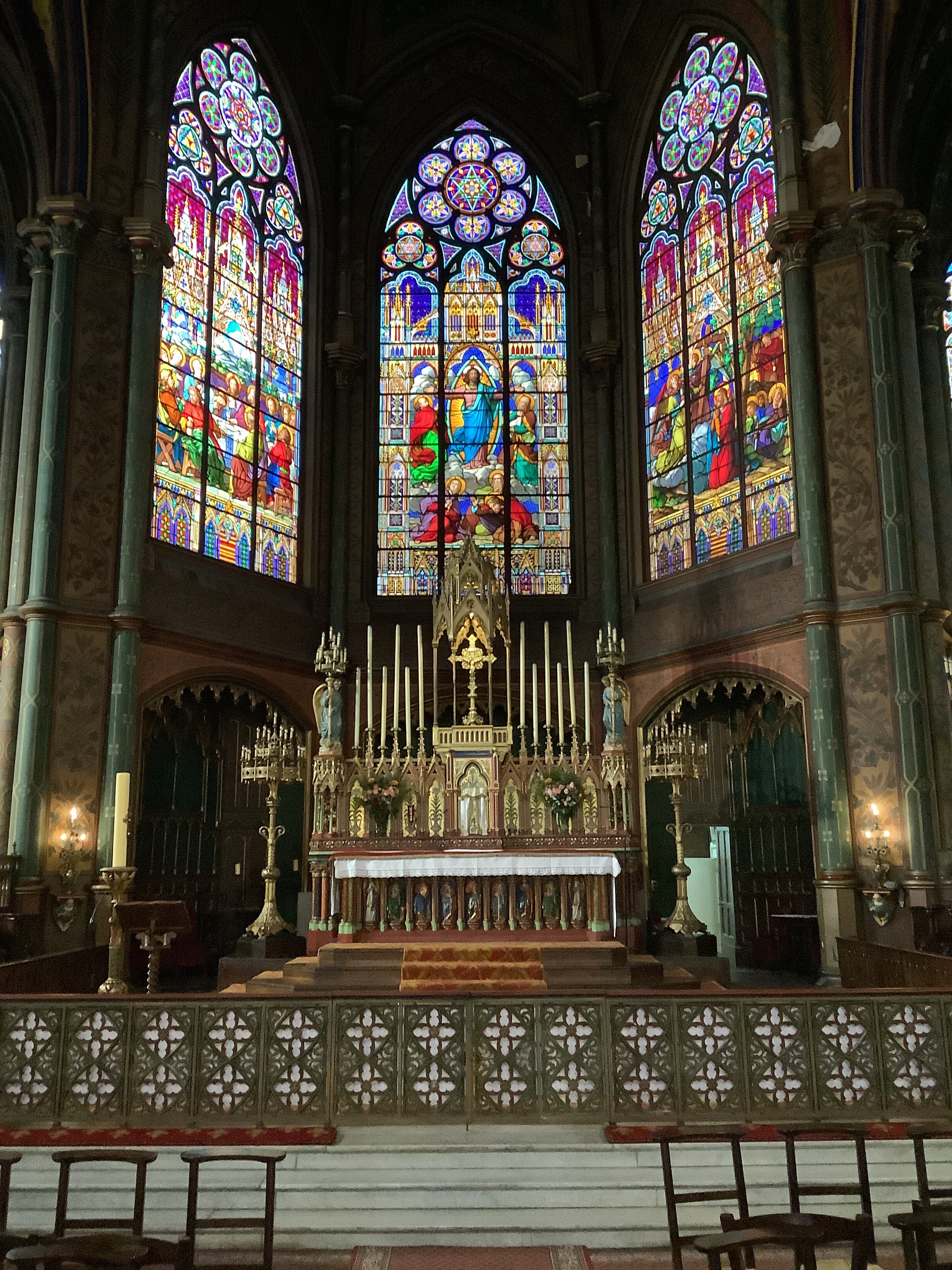
Choir and Altar of Saint-Eugene-Sainte-Cecile, Paris

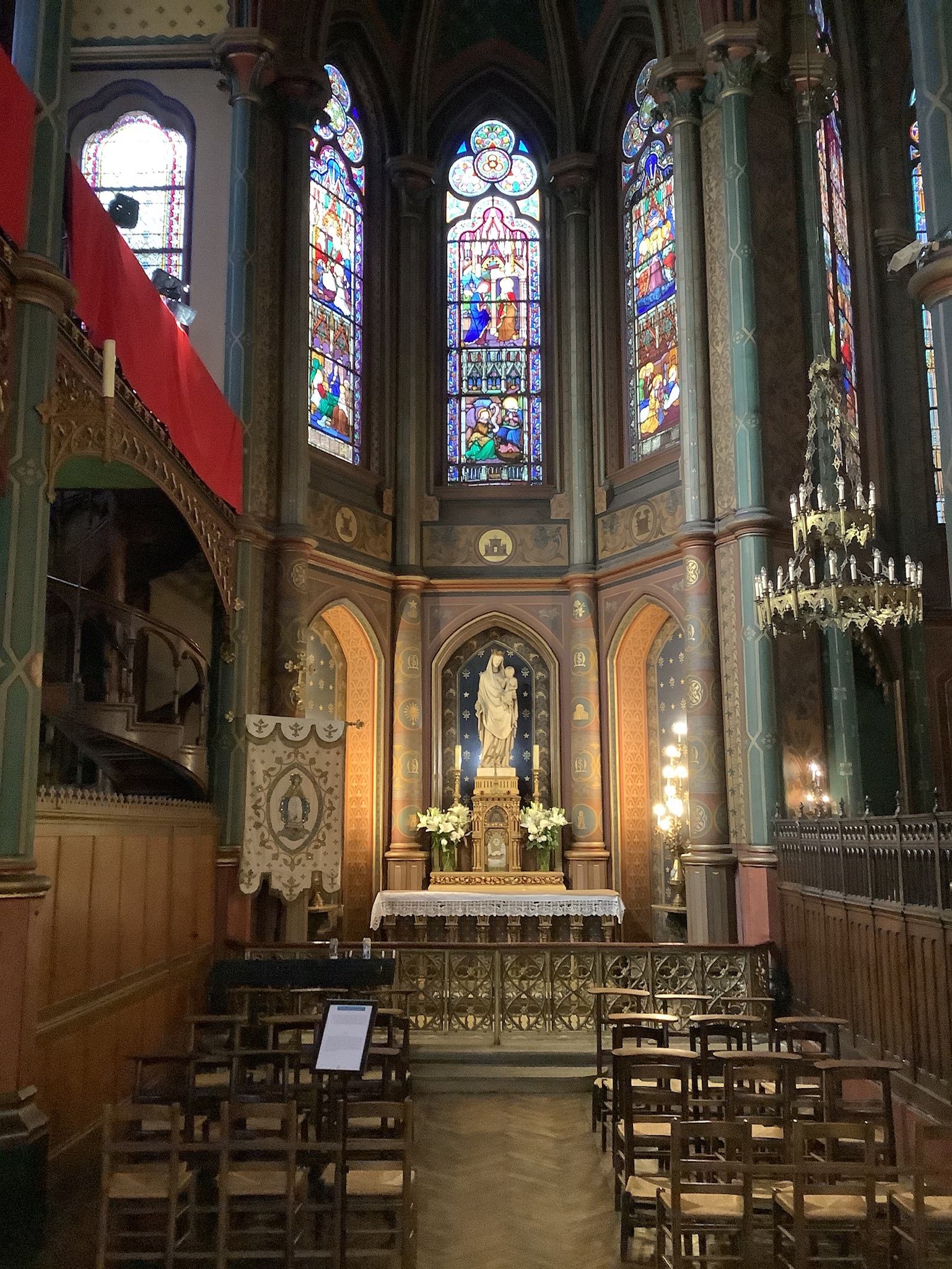
Chapel of the Virgin

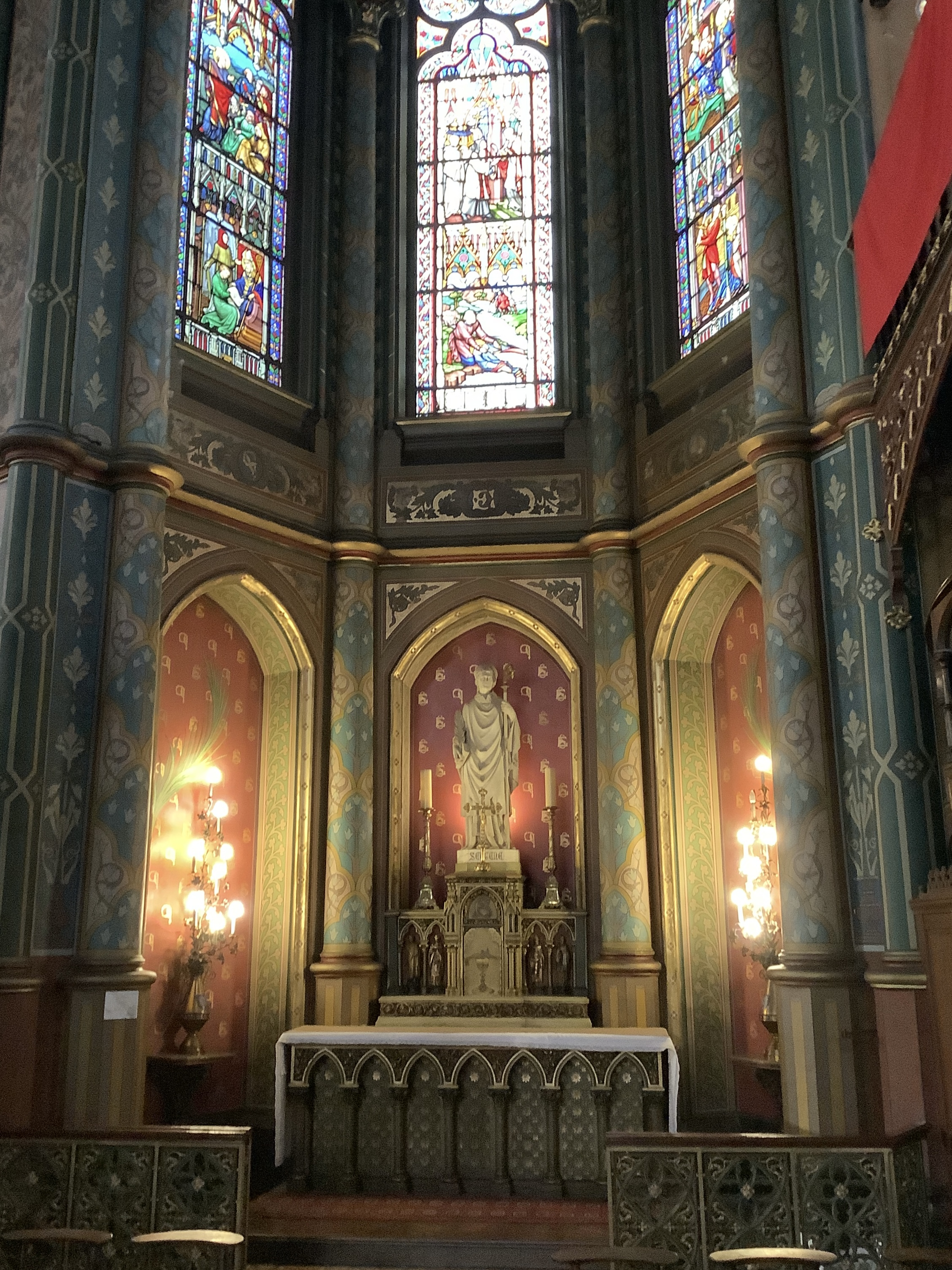
Chapel of Saint-Eugene

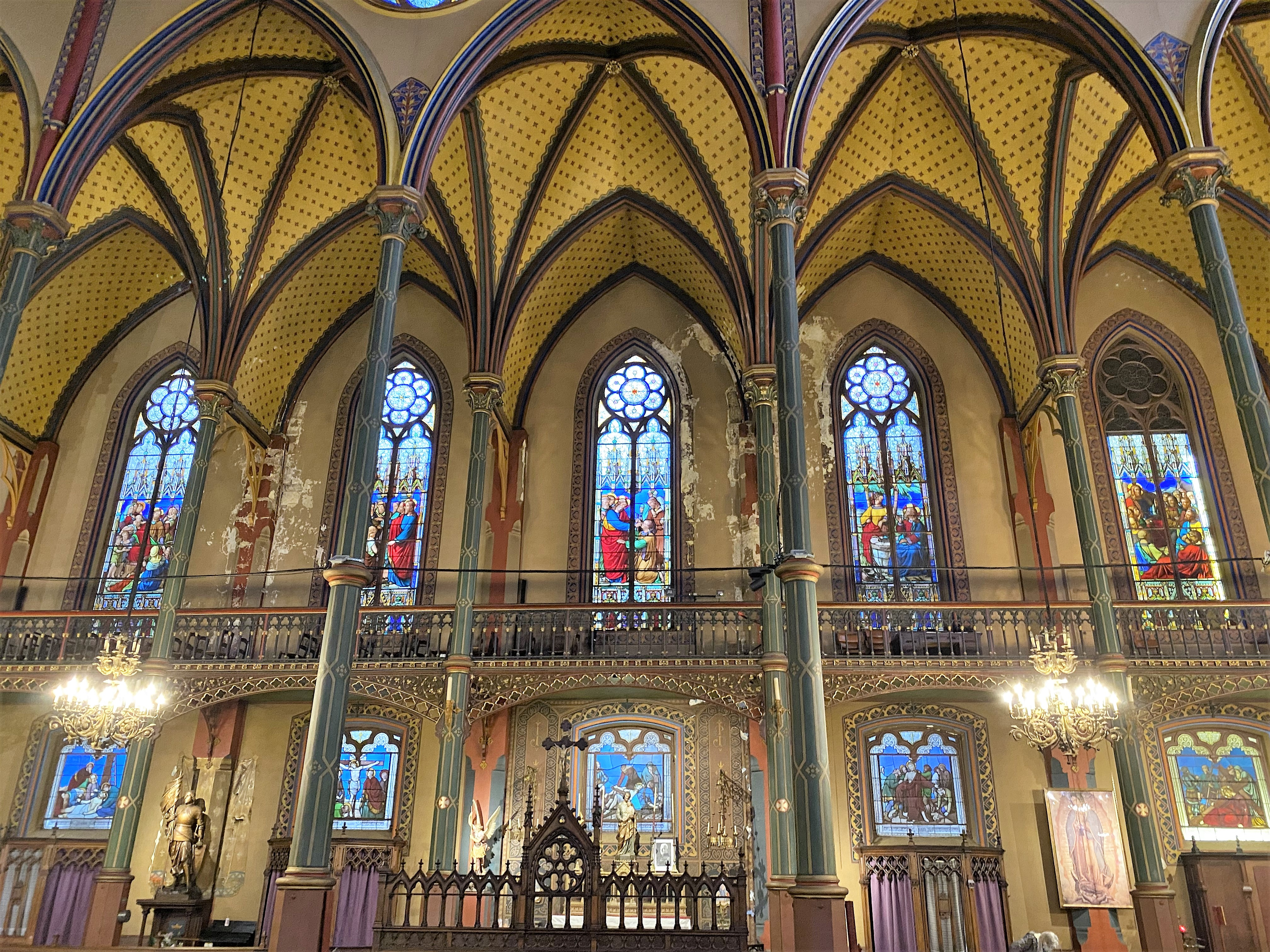
Side of the choir and nave, with 'Stations of the Cross" windows on lower level

The interior of the church, unlike the plain exterior, is full of light and color. The arcades of thick stone columns and pillar which separate the nave from the collateral aisles in traditional Gothic churches have been replaced by rows of tall, slender iron columns painted in vivid blues reds and greens, which form arcades with pointed arches high overhead. The vaults of the high ceiling, like traditional Gothic vaults, are formed by criss-crossing ribs, but in this case the ribs are purely decorative, since the ceiling is supported by the iron frame of the building.

== Stained glass ==
One of the most notable features of the church is the remarkable group of stained glass windows made by several of the most celebrated French glass artists of the 19th century.

The large windows behind the altar in the choir were the work of Gaspard Gsell (1814-1904). They illustrate the Transfiguration of Christ, "The Last Supper" of Christ with the disciples, and "Christ in the Garden of Olives," praying before his arrest and crucifixion.

The windows on the lower level illustrate the "Stations of the Cross" during the crucifixion of Christ. This is the only known set of stained glass windows that depicts all of the stations of the cross. The first window was made by Antoine Lusson, and the thirteen others by Eugène Oudinot (1827-1899). The windows on the upper level are by Gaspard Gsell and depict scenes from the private and public life of Christ including his pardoning of an adulteress, and his betrayal by Judas.

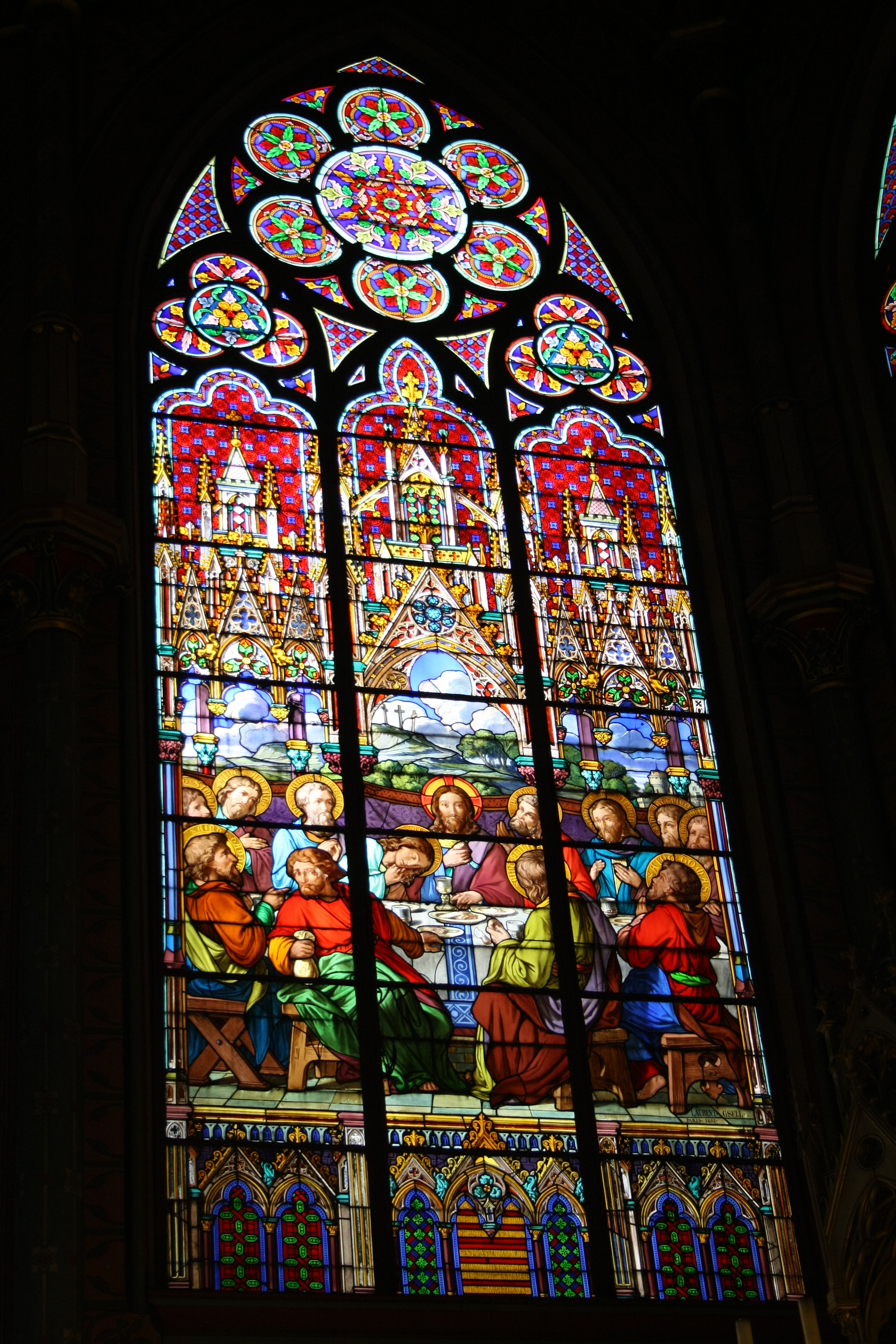
"The Last Supper" in Choir by Gaspard Gsell (1814−1904)

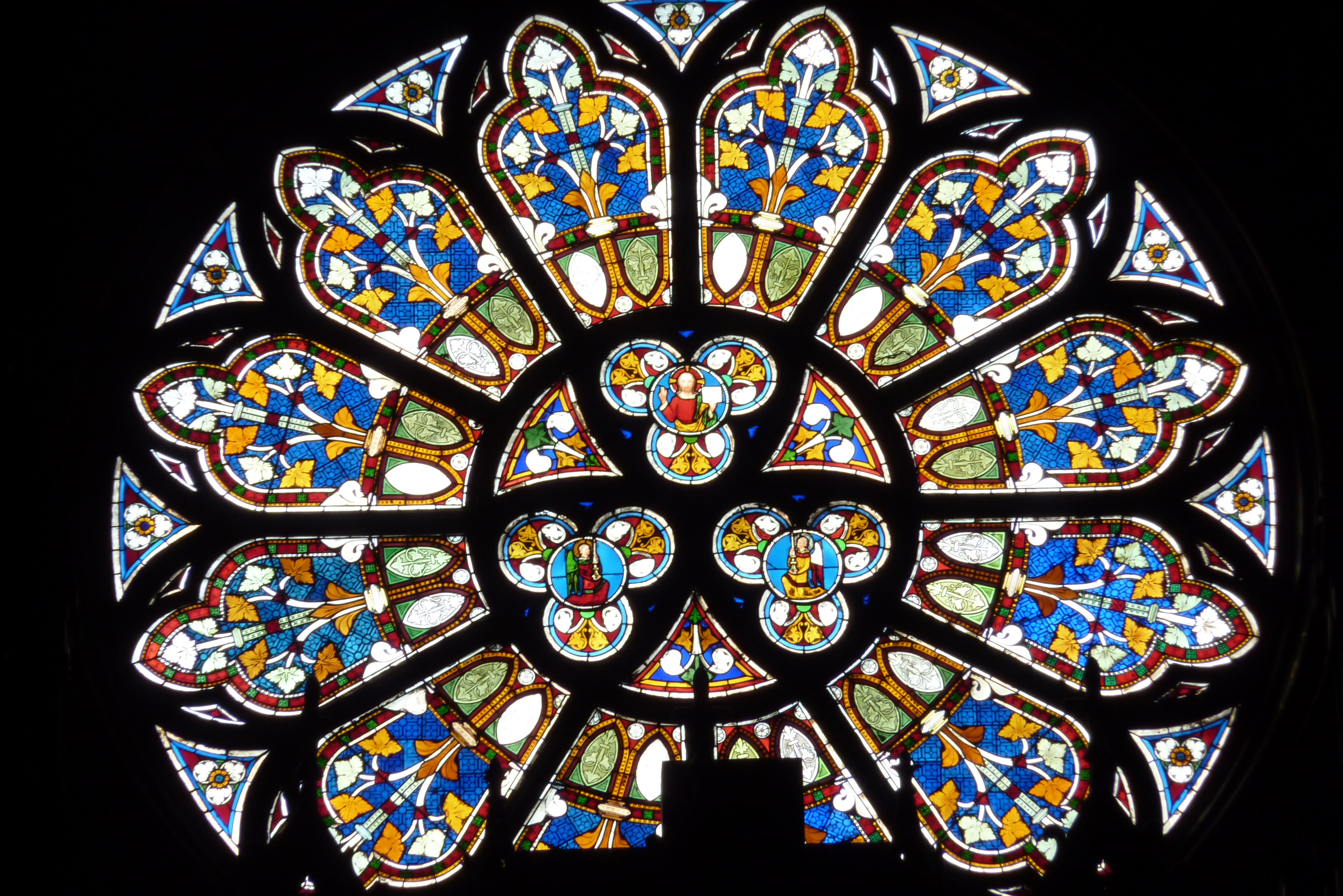
The Rose Window

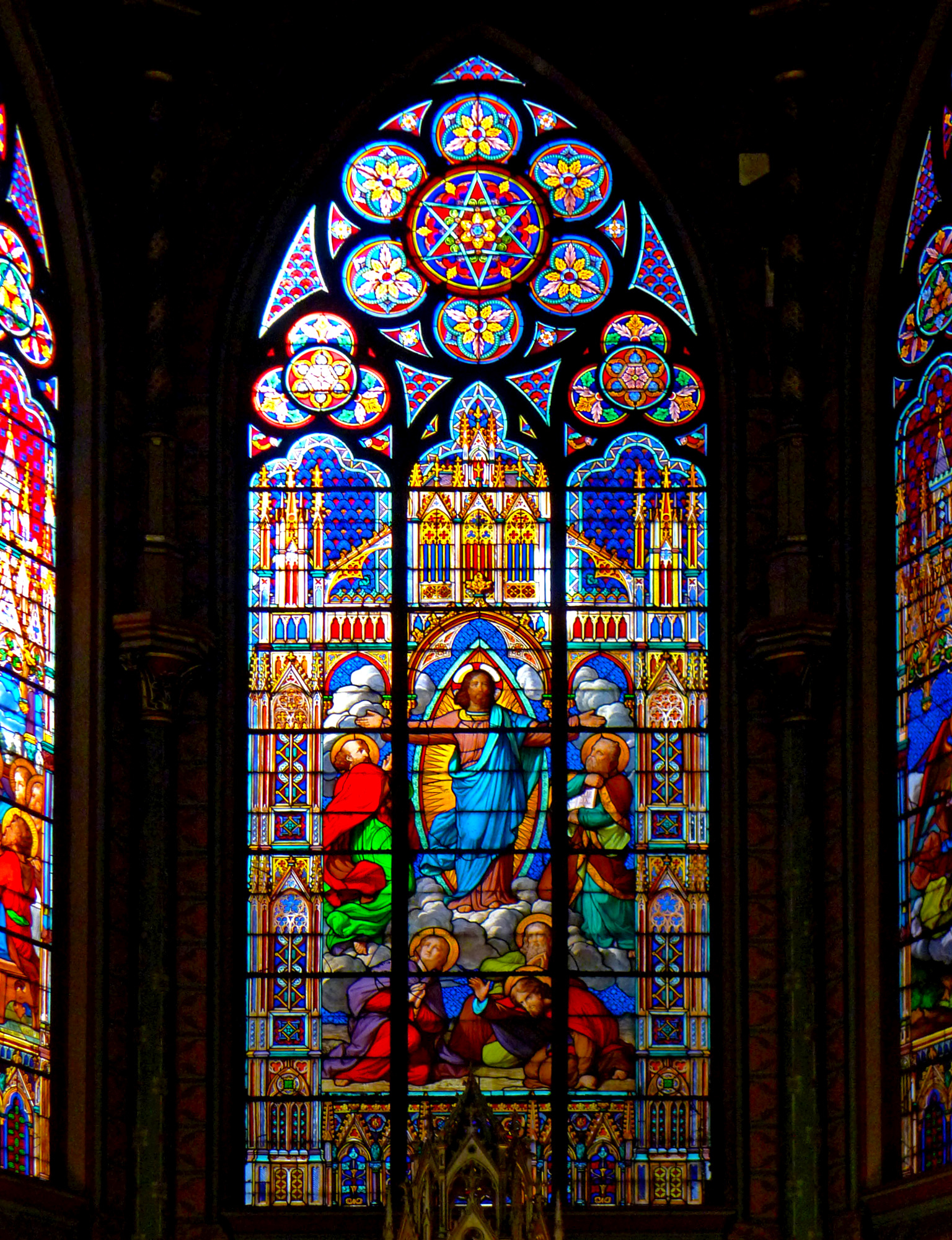
Central window behind the altar, "The risen Christ appears to the Apostles", by Gaspard Gsell

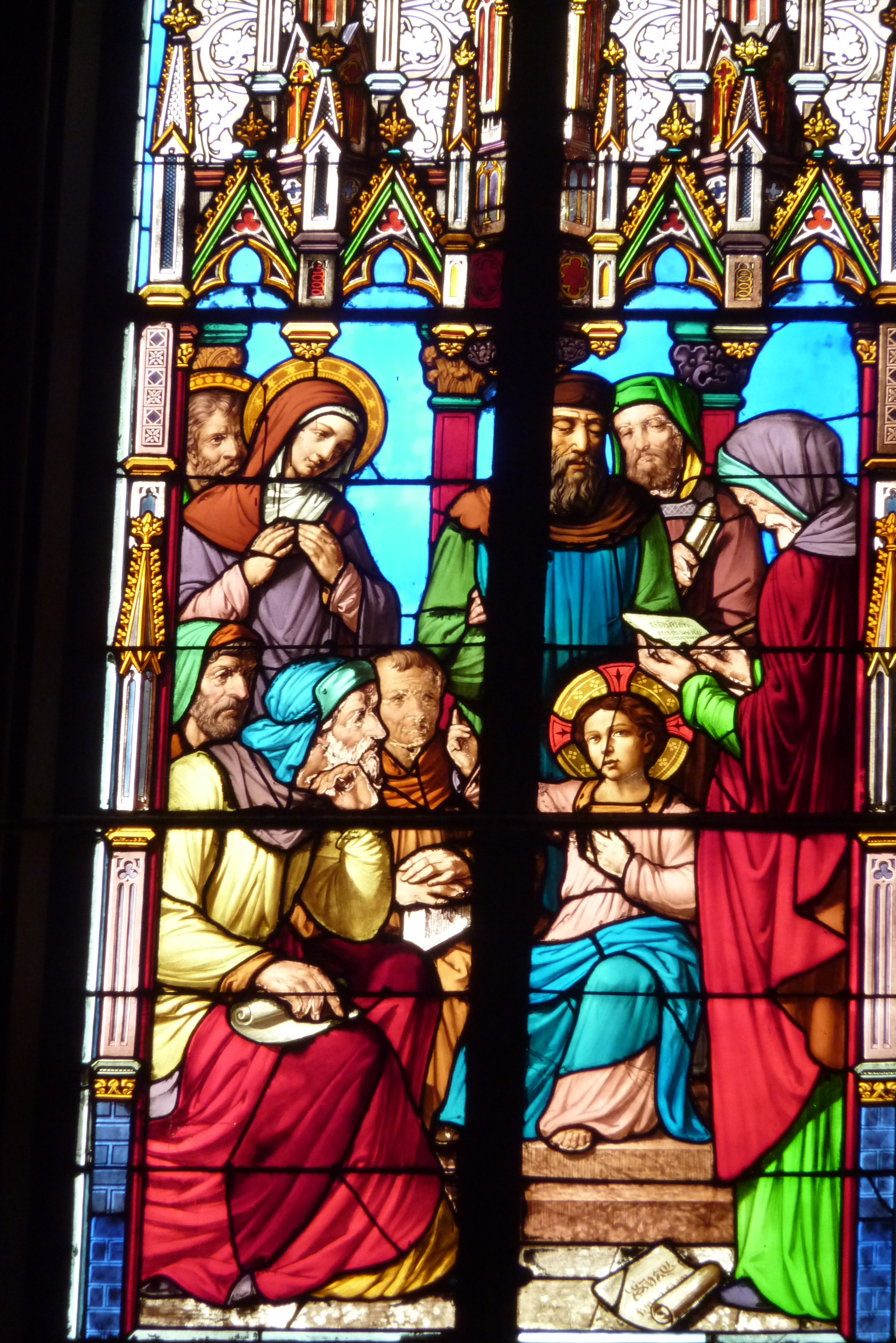
"Christ in the Temple" by Gaspard Gsell (1814−1904)
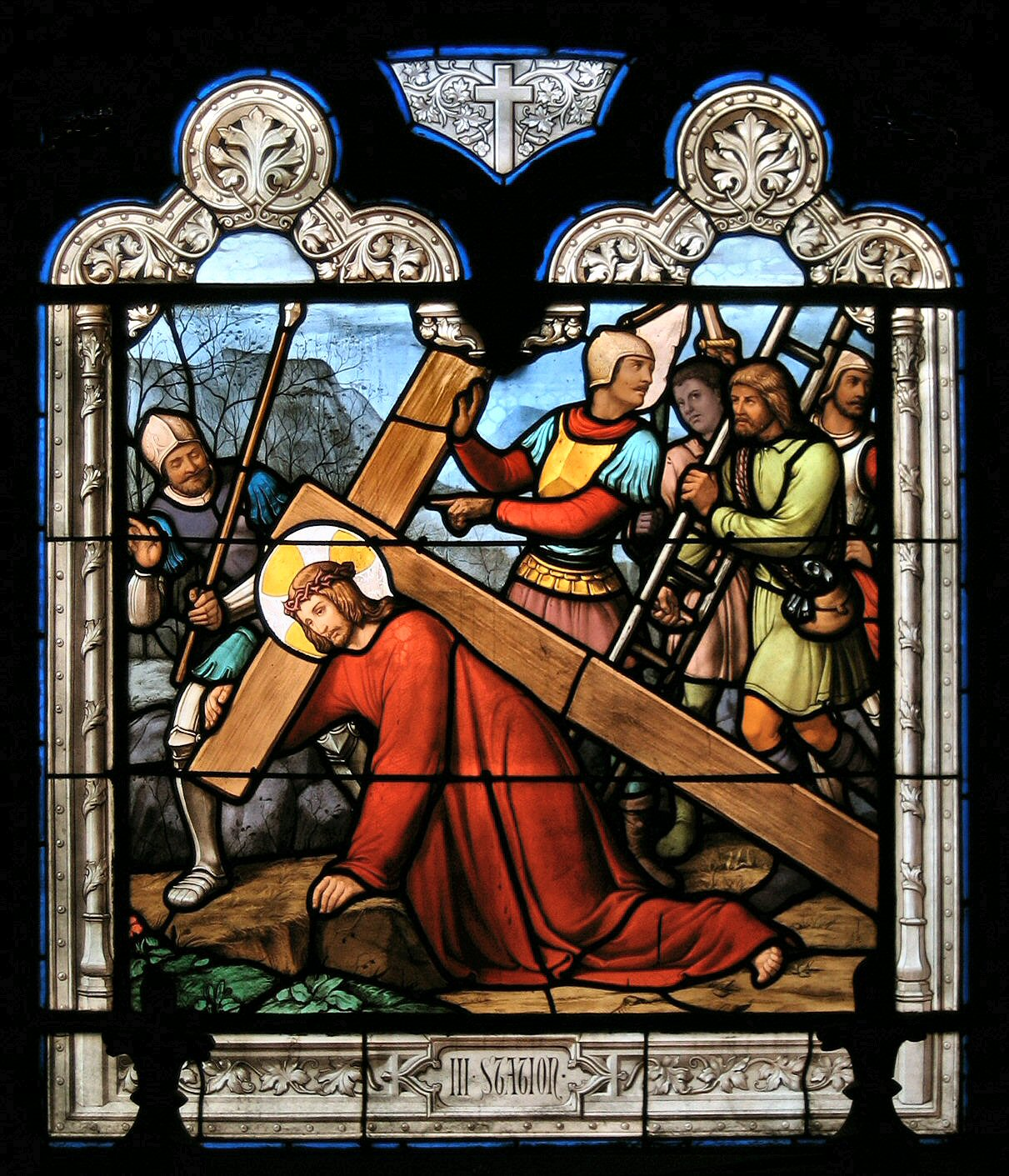
"Stations of the Cross - Station Three"

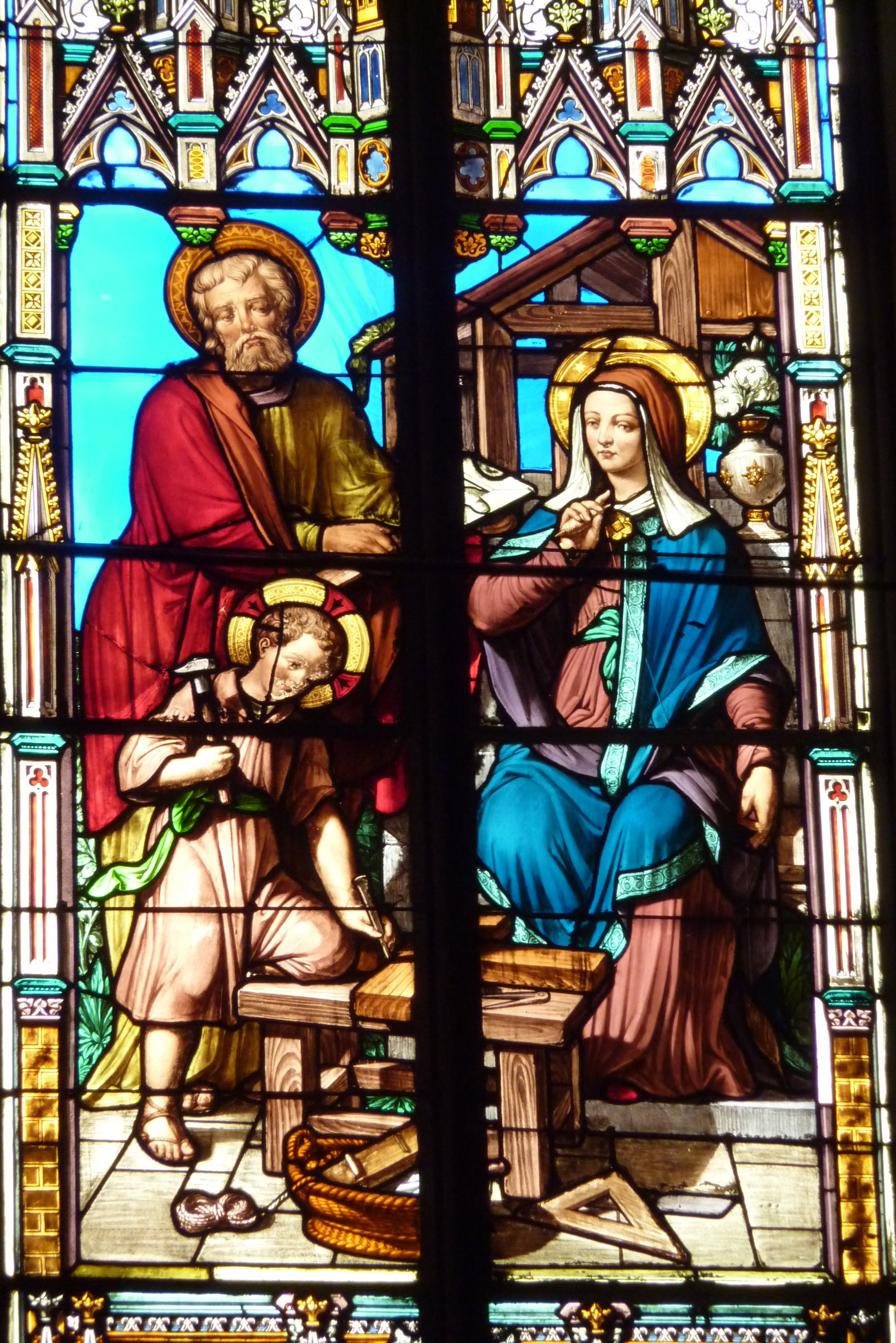
:Stations of the Cross - "The Holy Family"

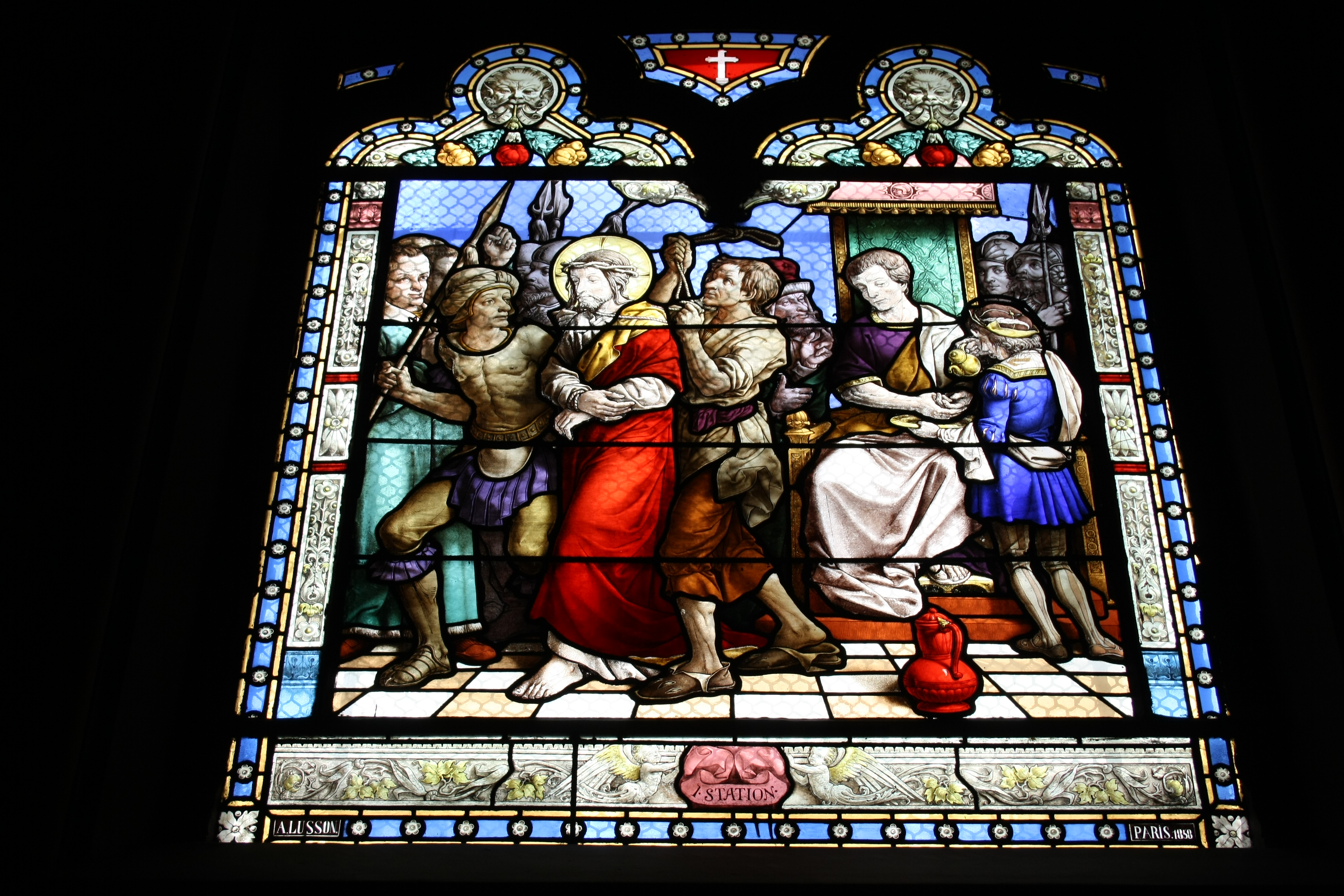
"Stations of the Cross- Christ tried by Pontius Pilate" (Signed "A. LUSSON PARIS 1858")

=== Art and Decoration ===
The interior decoration, wood work and metal work is colourful. The chapel of the baptistry has a baptismal font, featuring angels and a demon, which suggest the soon-to-arrive Art Nouveau style.

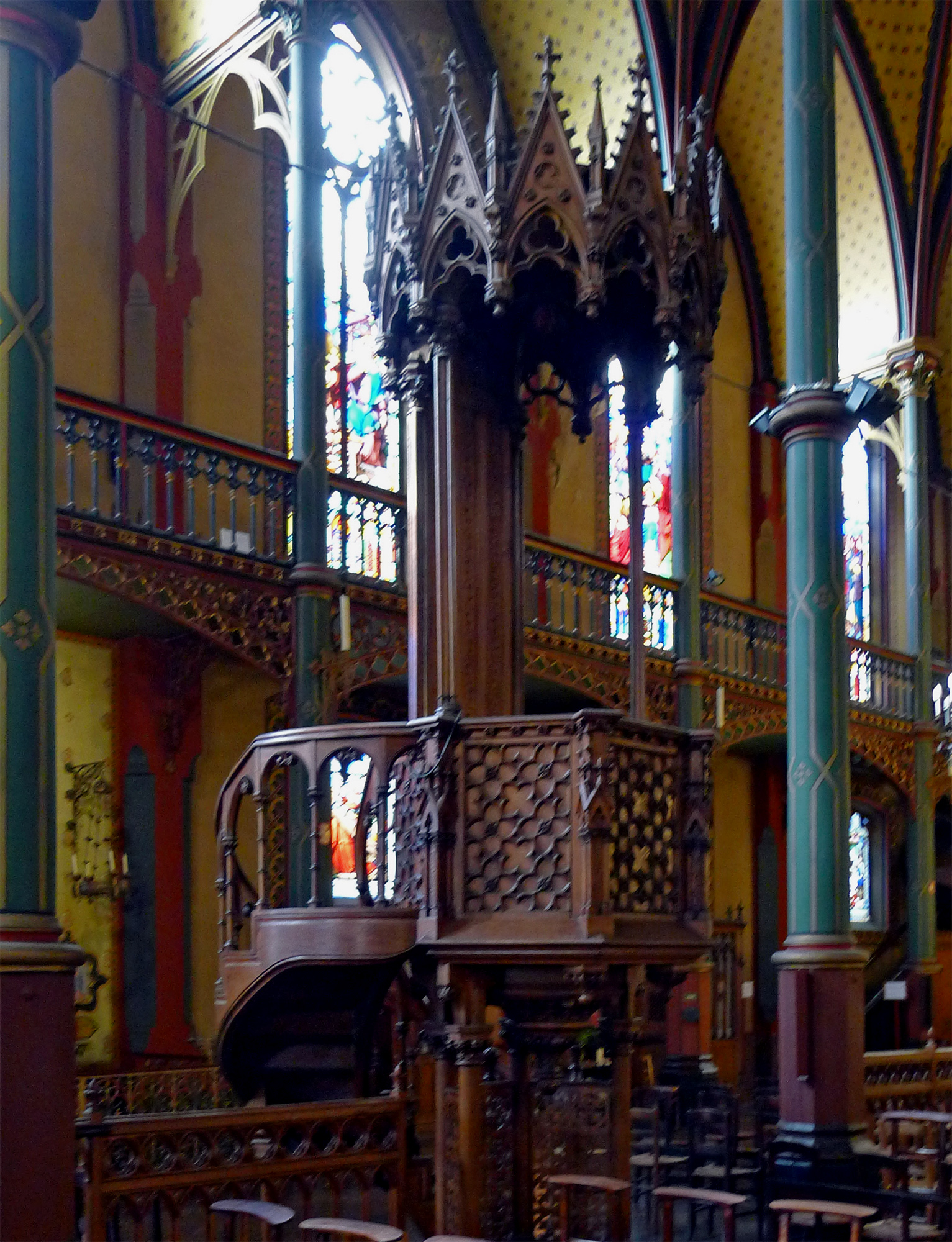
The carved pulpit in the nave

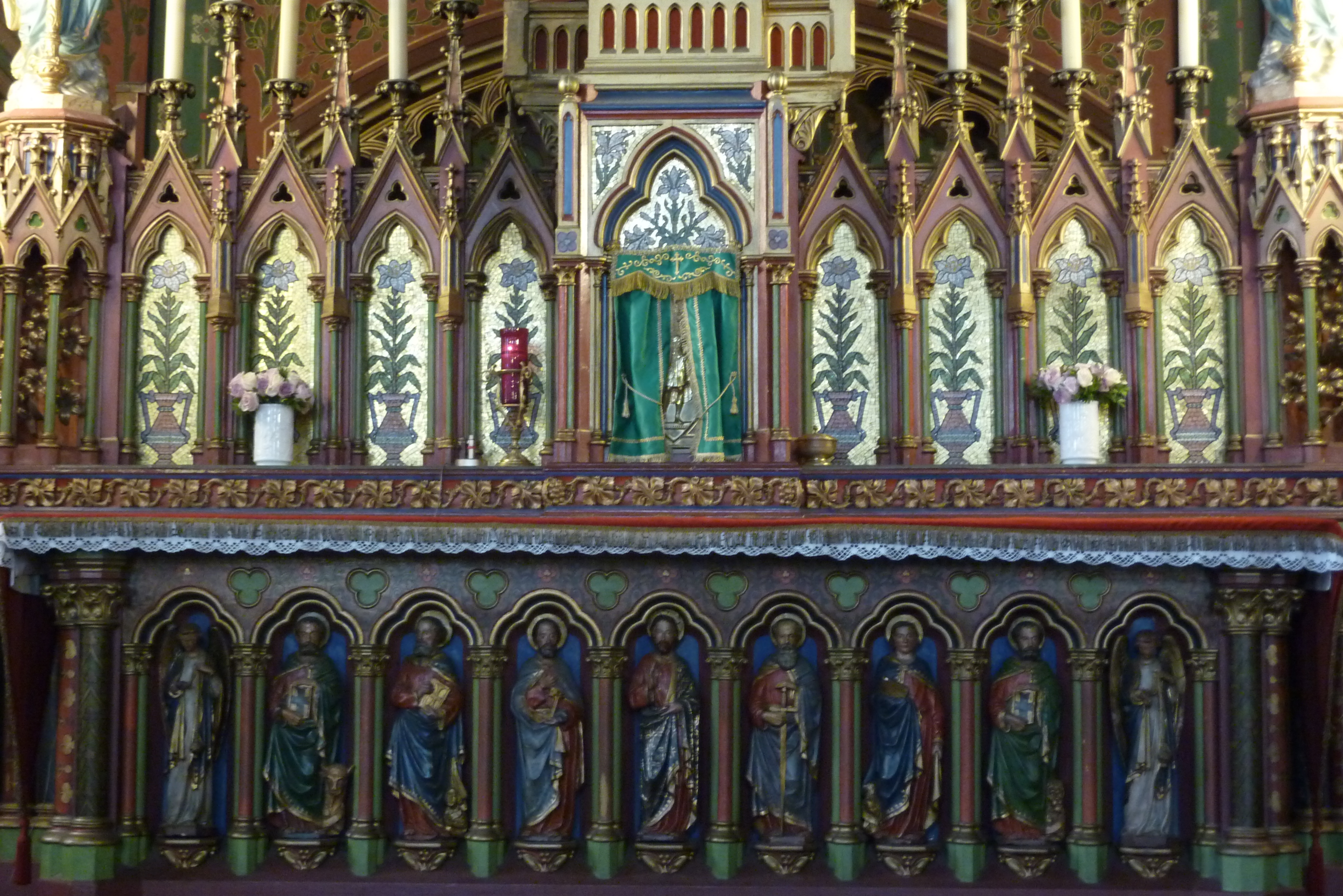
Decoration of the altar

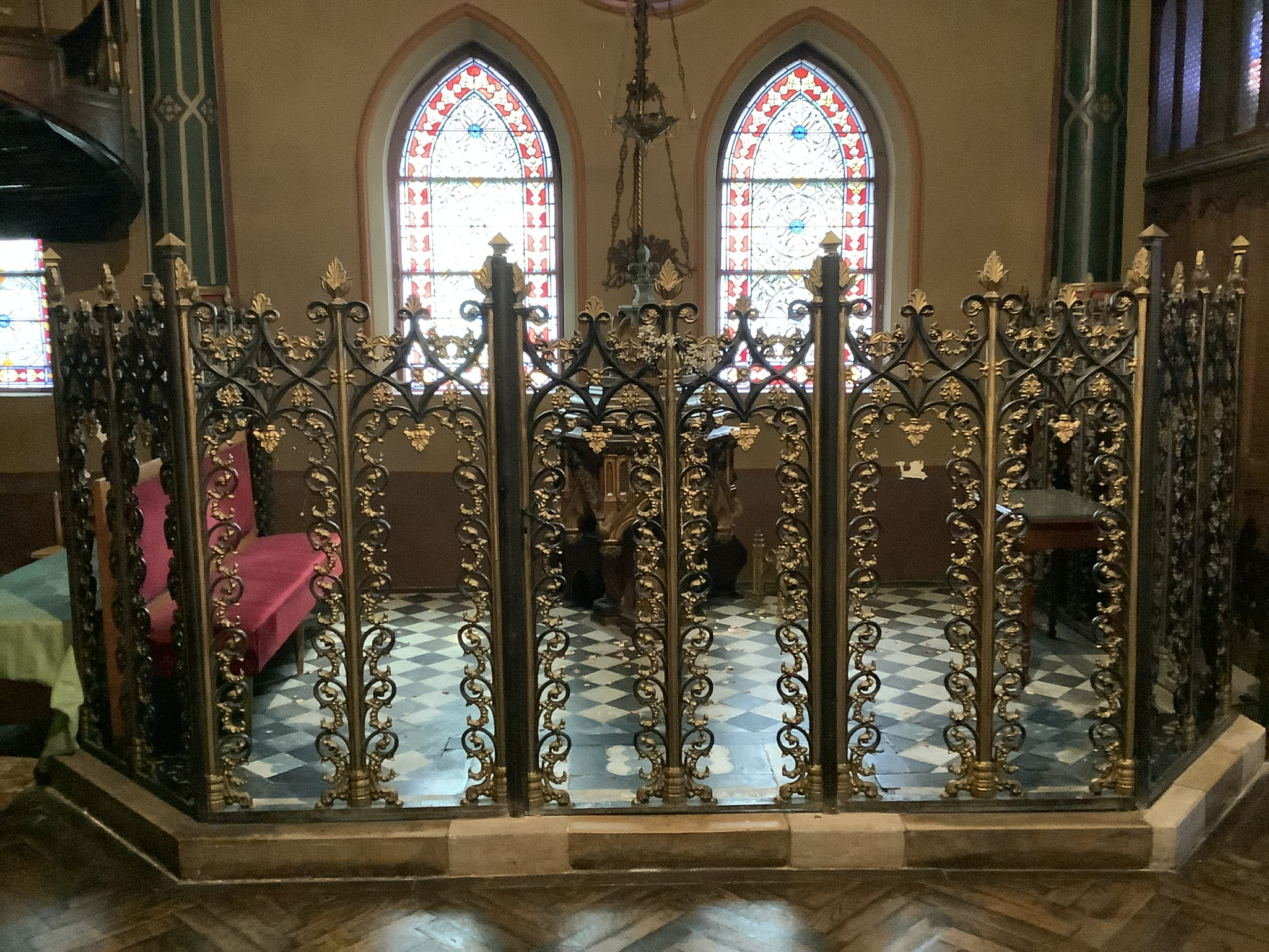
Grille of the Baptismal Chapel

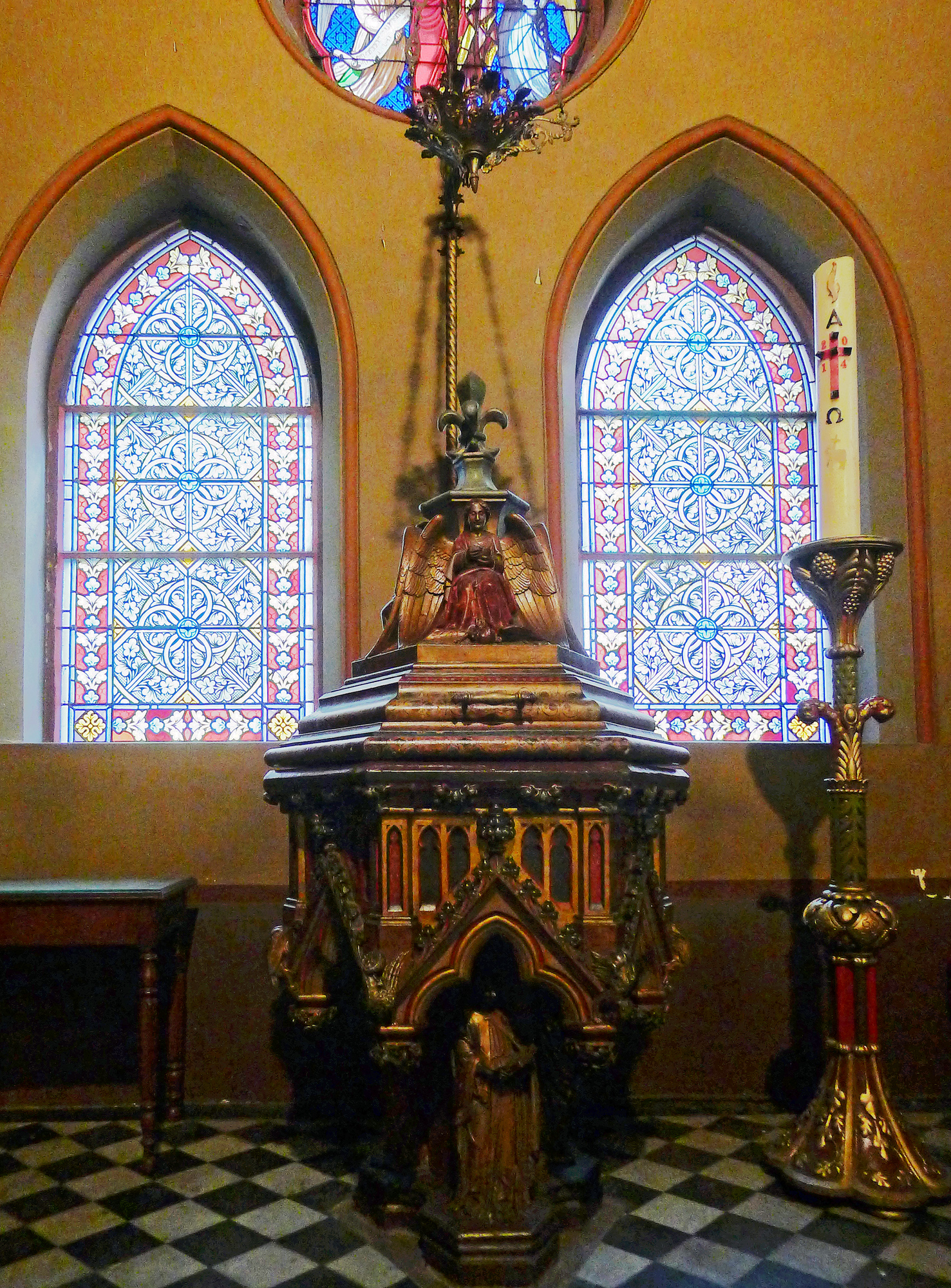
The Baptismal Font

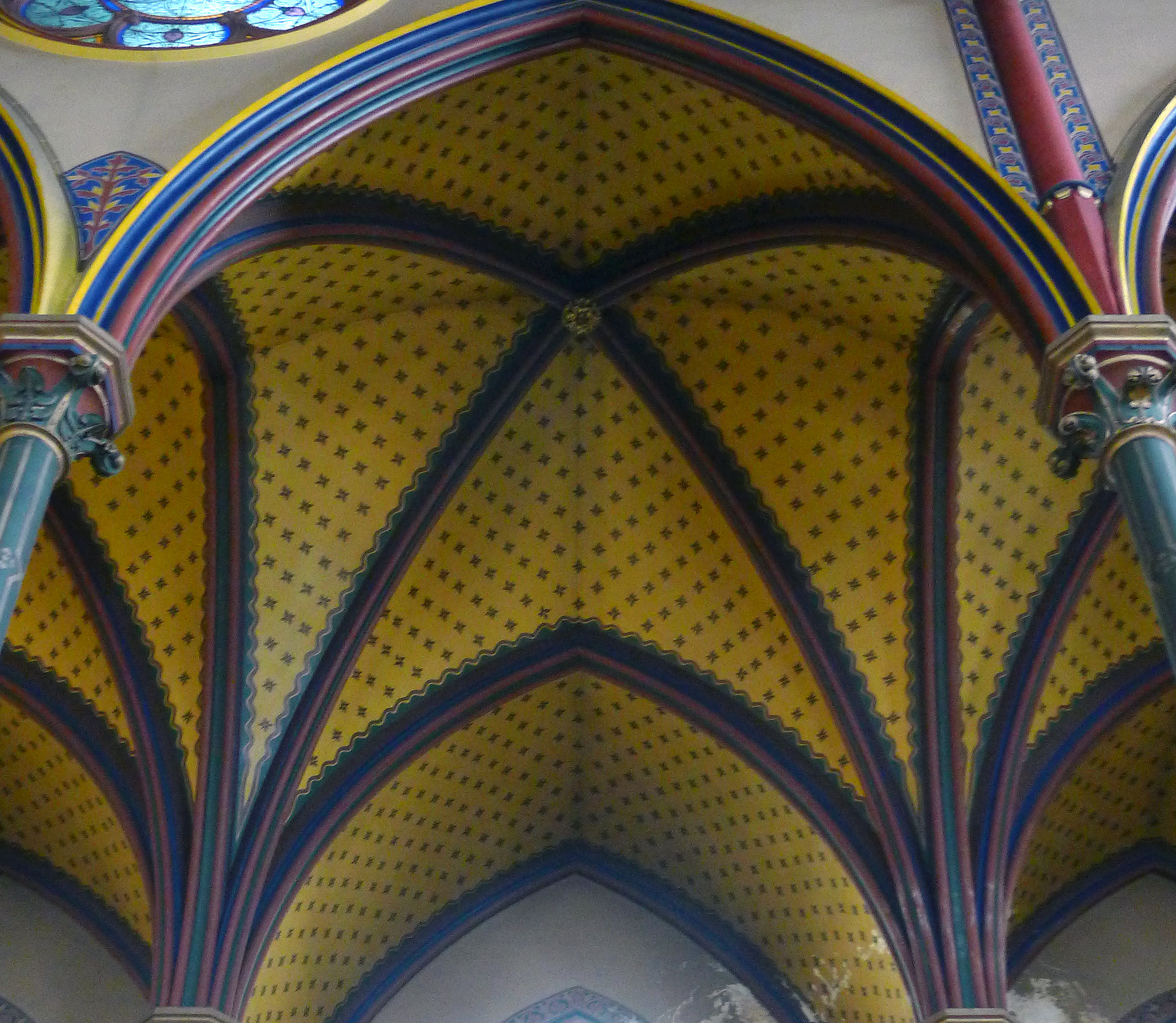
Decorative ceiling vault

=== Organ ===
The grand pipe organ was built by Joseph Merklin and had been exhibited at the 1855 Exposition Universelle in Paris prior to being installed in the church.

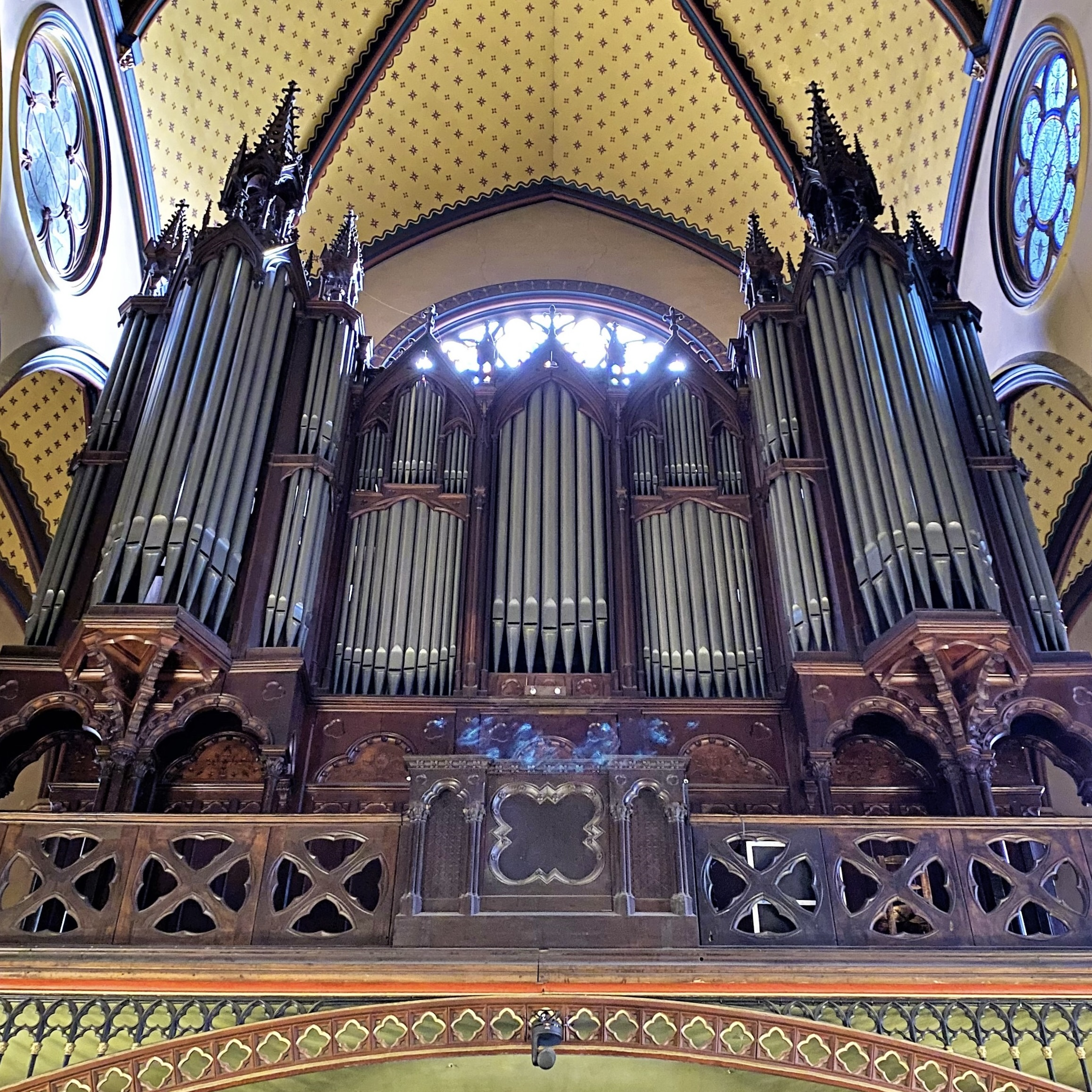
The grand organ on the tribune

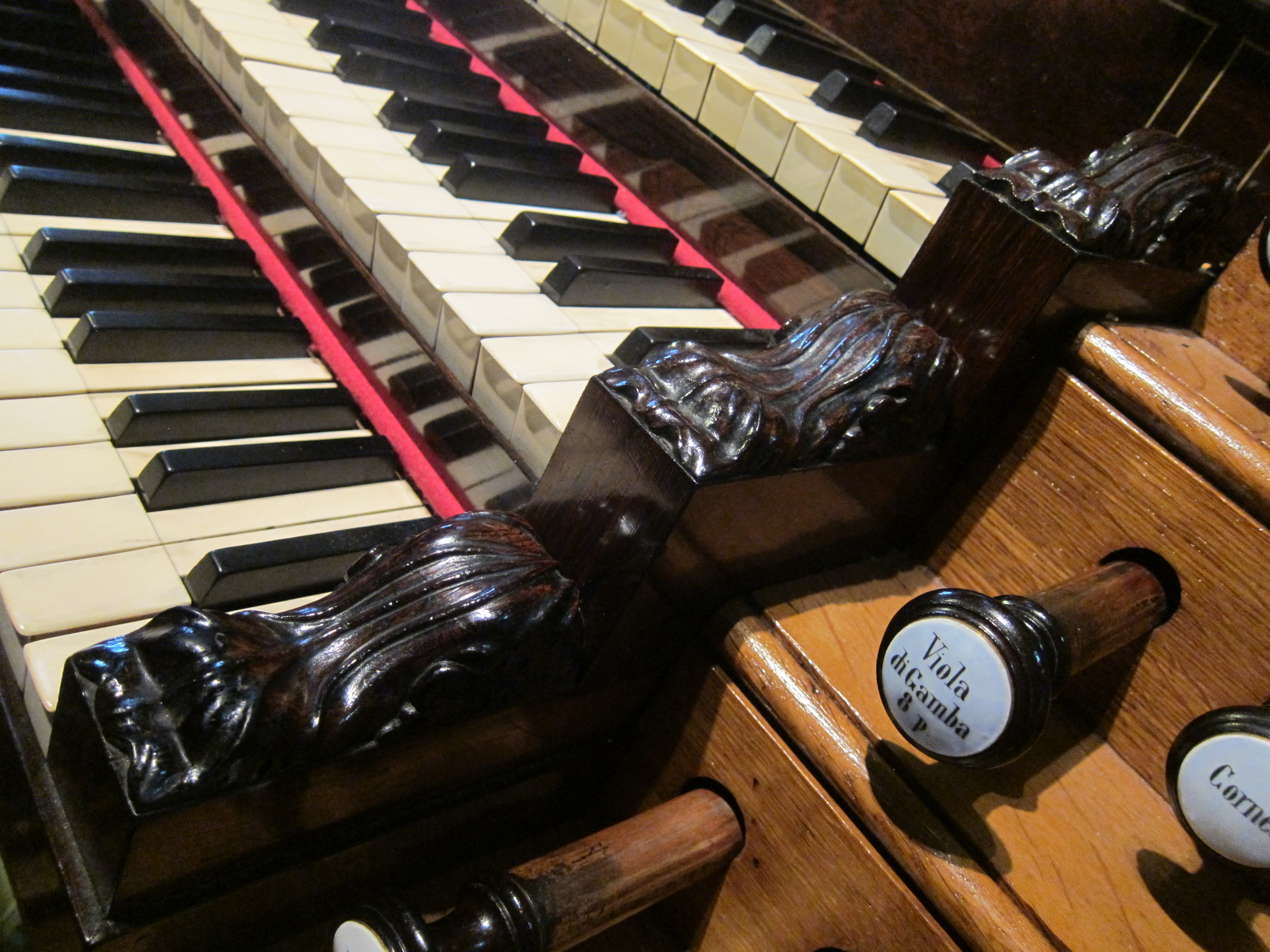
Detail of the console of the grand organ

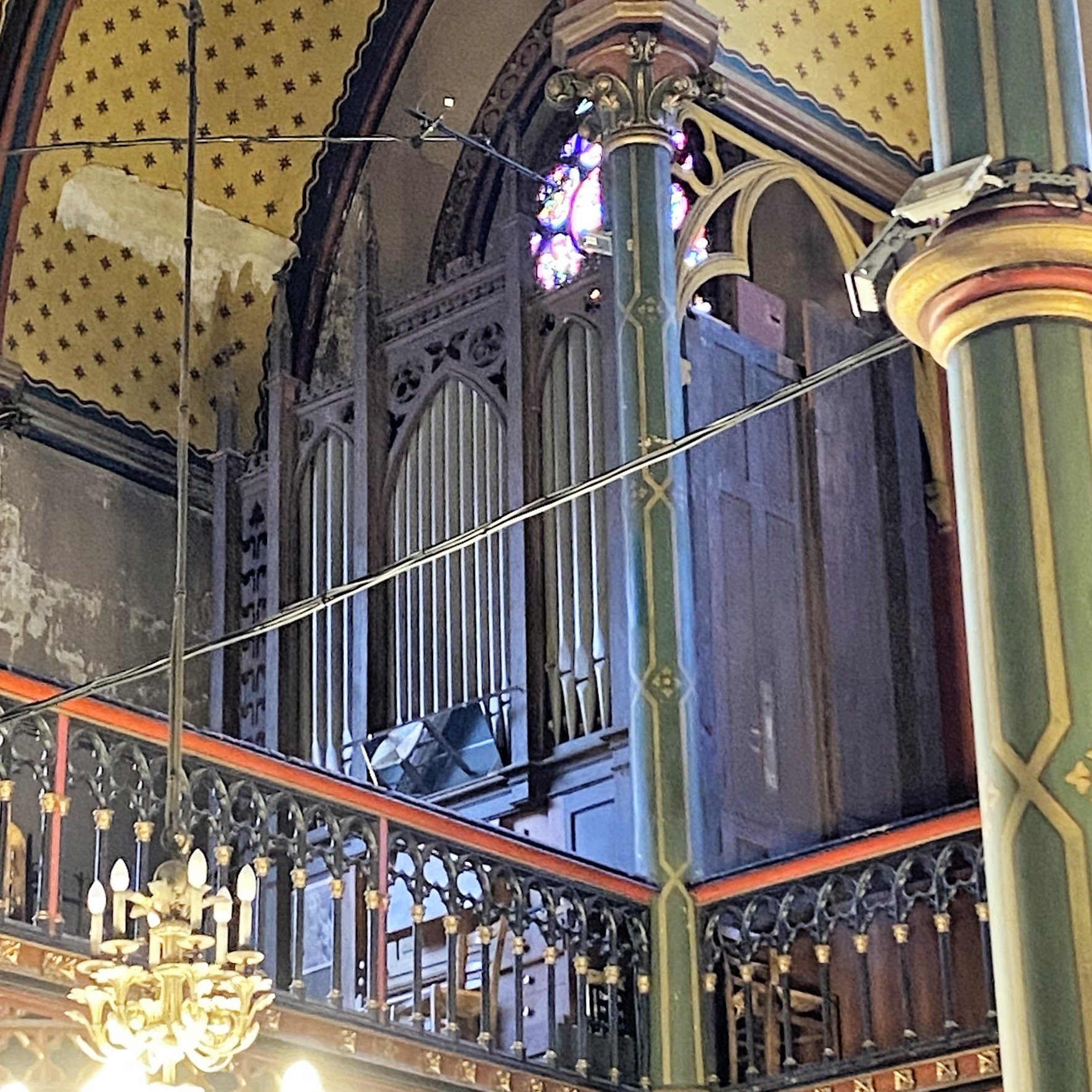
The choir organ of Saint-Eugène-Saint-Cécile

== People associated with the church ==
Clergy associated with Saint-Eugène include Albert Le Nordez who gave conferences for Christian women there in the 1890s and Jean-Pierre Batut who was the church's pastor from 2007 to 2009.

Renaud de Vilbac was the church's first organist. He was succeeded by Raoul Pugno who served from 1871 until 1892. Pierre Pincemaille was titular organist between 1982 and 1987.

The wedding of Jules Verne to Honorine Morel took place at Saint-Eugène on 10 January 1857.

The funeral of Léon Battu was held at the church in 1857 as were the funerals of Louis Clapisson in 1866, Camille Corot in 1875 and Clairville in 1879.

== Bibliography (in French) ==
- Dumoulin, Aline; Ardisson, Alexandra; Maingard, Jérôme; Antonello, Murielle; Églises de Paris (2010), Éditions Massin, Issy-Les-Moulineaux, ISBN 978-2-7072-0683-1 (in French)
