= Saint-Jean-Baptiste de Grenelle, Paris =

Church in Paris, France

Coordinates: 48°50′36″N 2°17′34″E

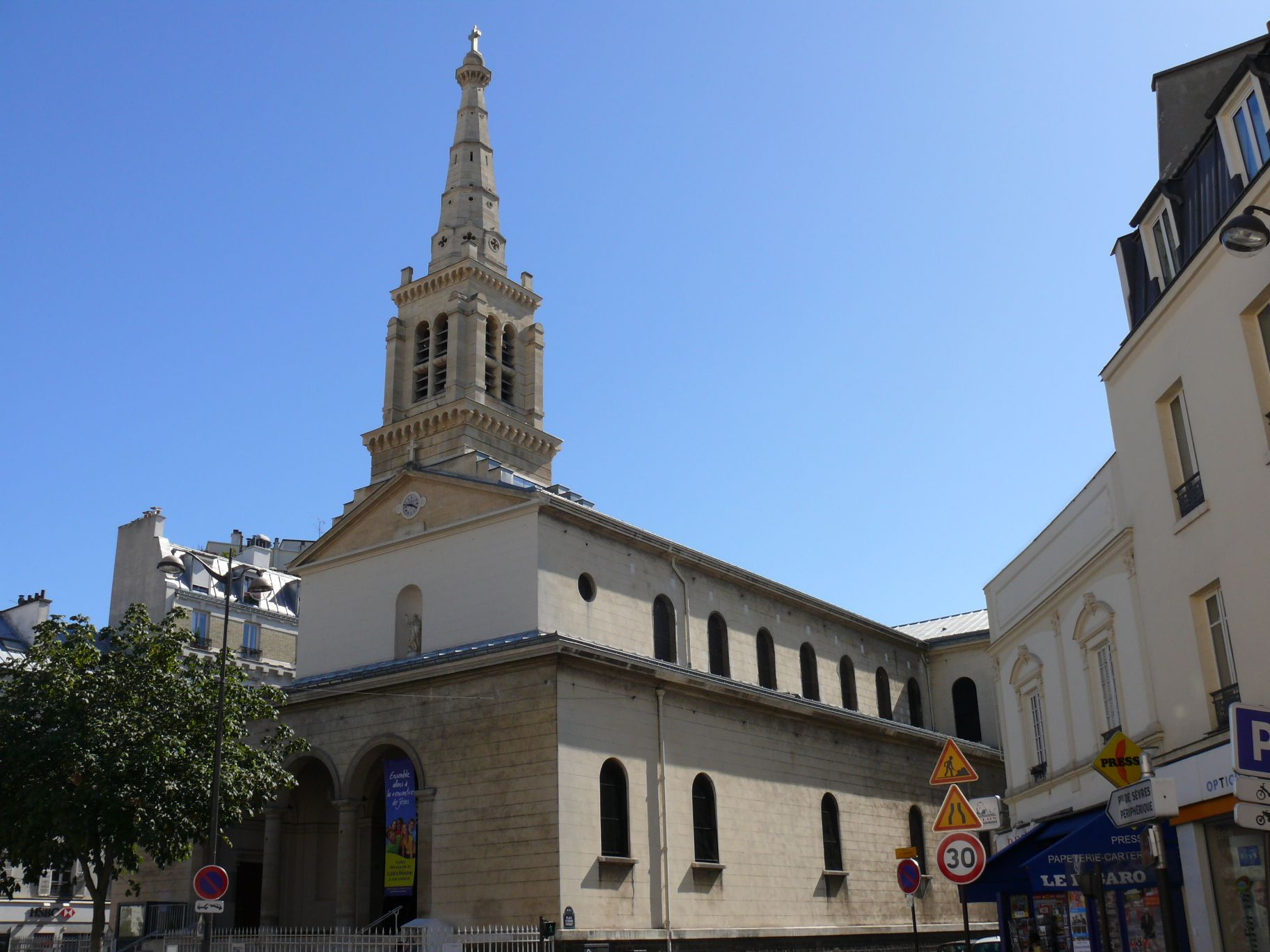
- Saint-Jean-Baptiste de Grenelle, Paris

Religion
- Affiliation: Catholic Church
- Province: Archdiocese of Paris
- Rite: Roman Rite

Location
- Location: 24 place Etienne-Perret, in the 15th arrondissement of Paris
- Interactive map of Saint-Jean-Baptiste de Grenelle, Paris

Architecture
- Style: Neo-Gothic exterior, Neo-classical interior
- Groundbreaking: 1828
- Completed: 1930

Saint-John-Baptiste de Grenelle is a Roman Catholic church located at 23 place Etienne-Perret in the 15th arrondissement of Paris, located near the Metro stations Commerce and Félix Faure. The church was constructed between 1824 and 1828, then rebuilt and greatly enlarged in 1924 and again in 1930. The exterior expresses the Neo-Gothic style, while the interior is in a very original version of the Neo-classical architectural style of Roman basilicas.

== History ==
As the population of the quarter grew rapidly and the earlier church proved to be too small, the new church was built by architect Leonard Bontat. It was built on the Plain of Grenelle on land given by a donor whose first name was Leonard Jean-Baptiste, which gave the church its name The church enlargements, sponsored by the Cardinal of Paris, included a new chapel underneath the choir.

The interior design, following the Roman basilica model, features arcades of classical columns and rounded arches. The upper level has rounded lunette windows. The cornice round the church emphasises the difference between the upper and level levels of the nave. The prominent colour of the nave interior yellow, the color associated with the Resurrection of Christ.

== Exterior ==
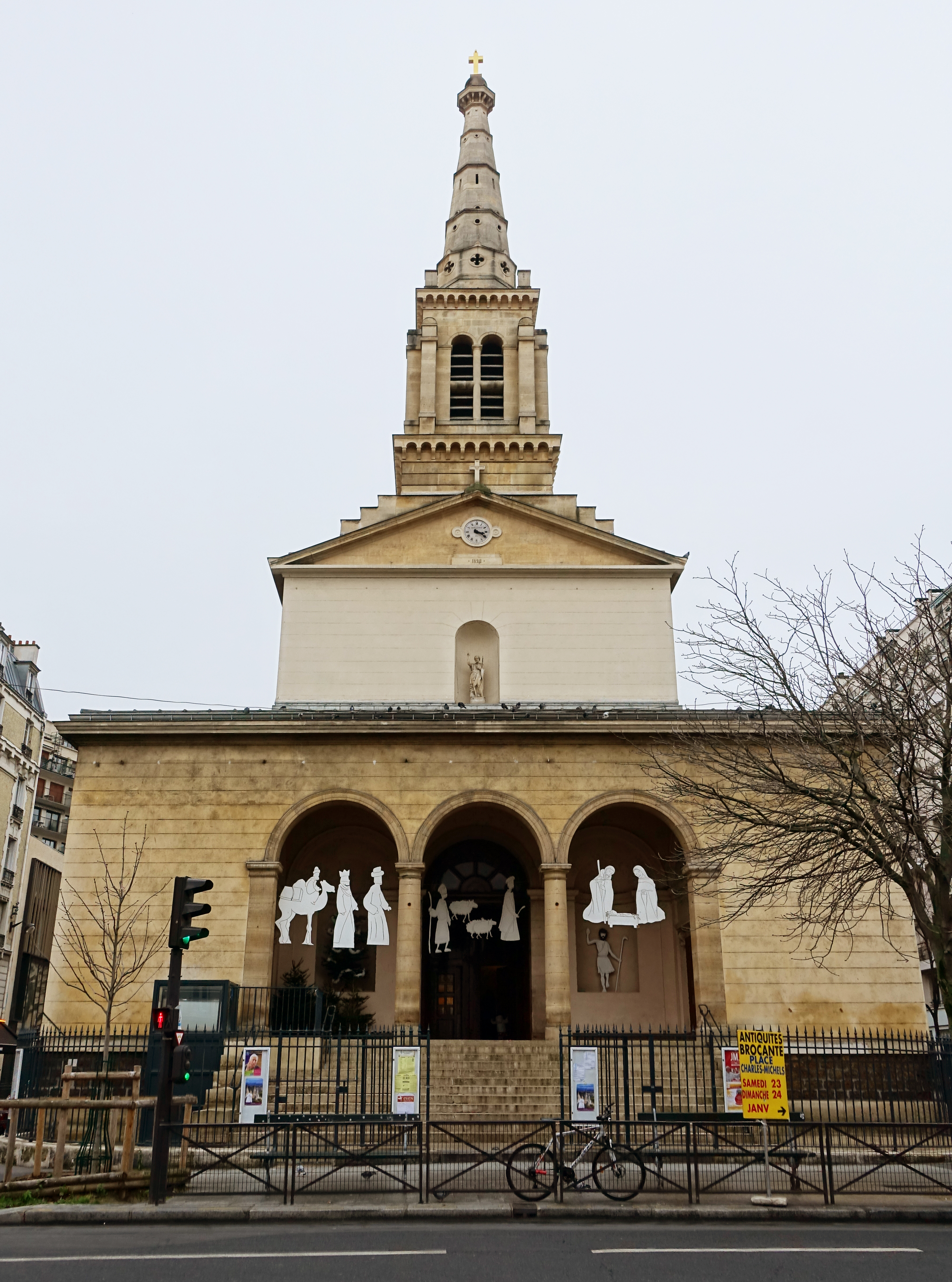
Facade of the church

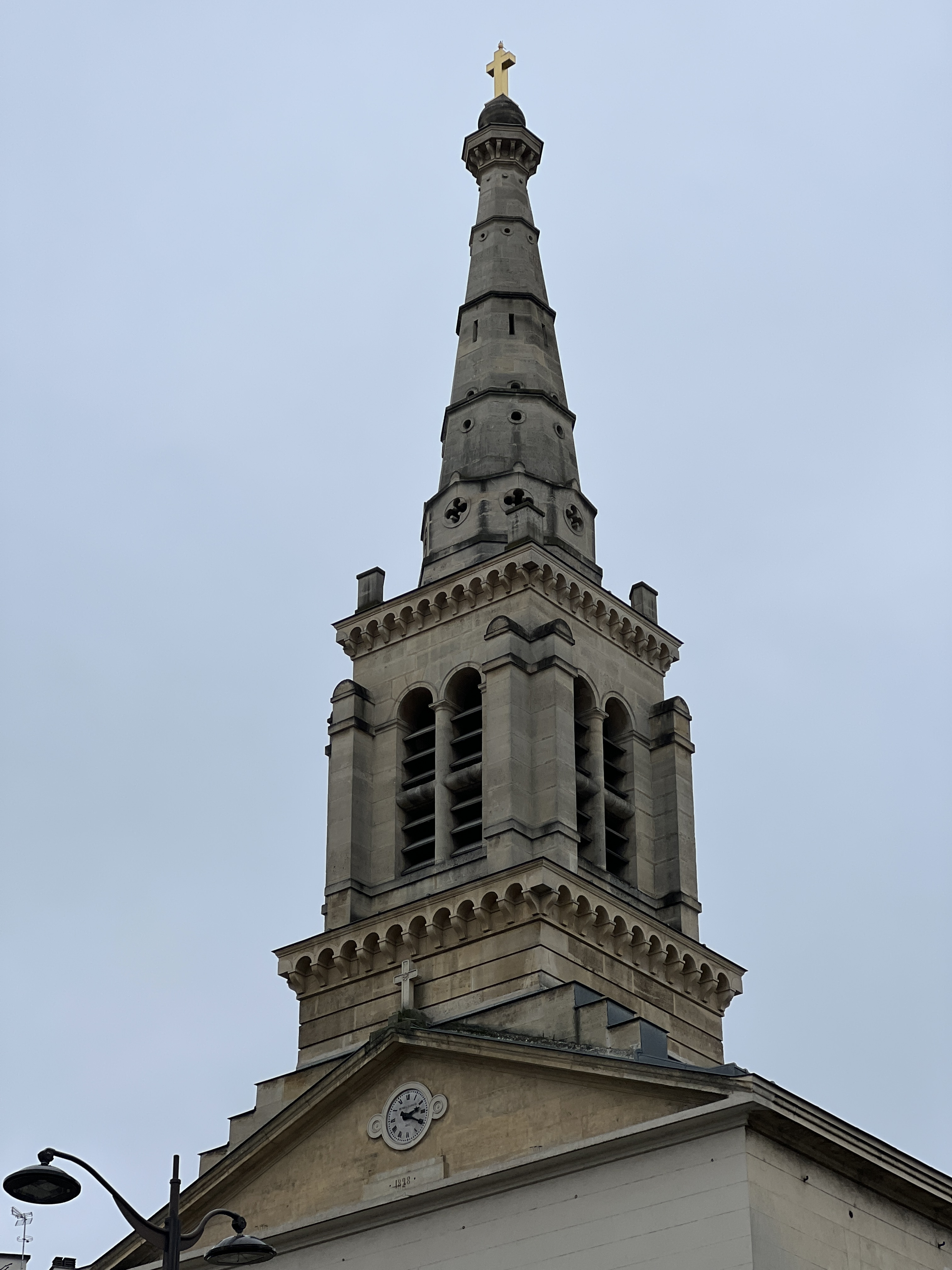
Bell tower

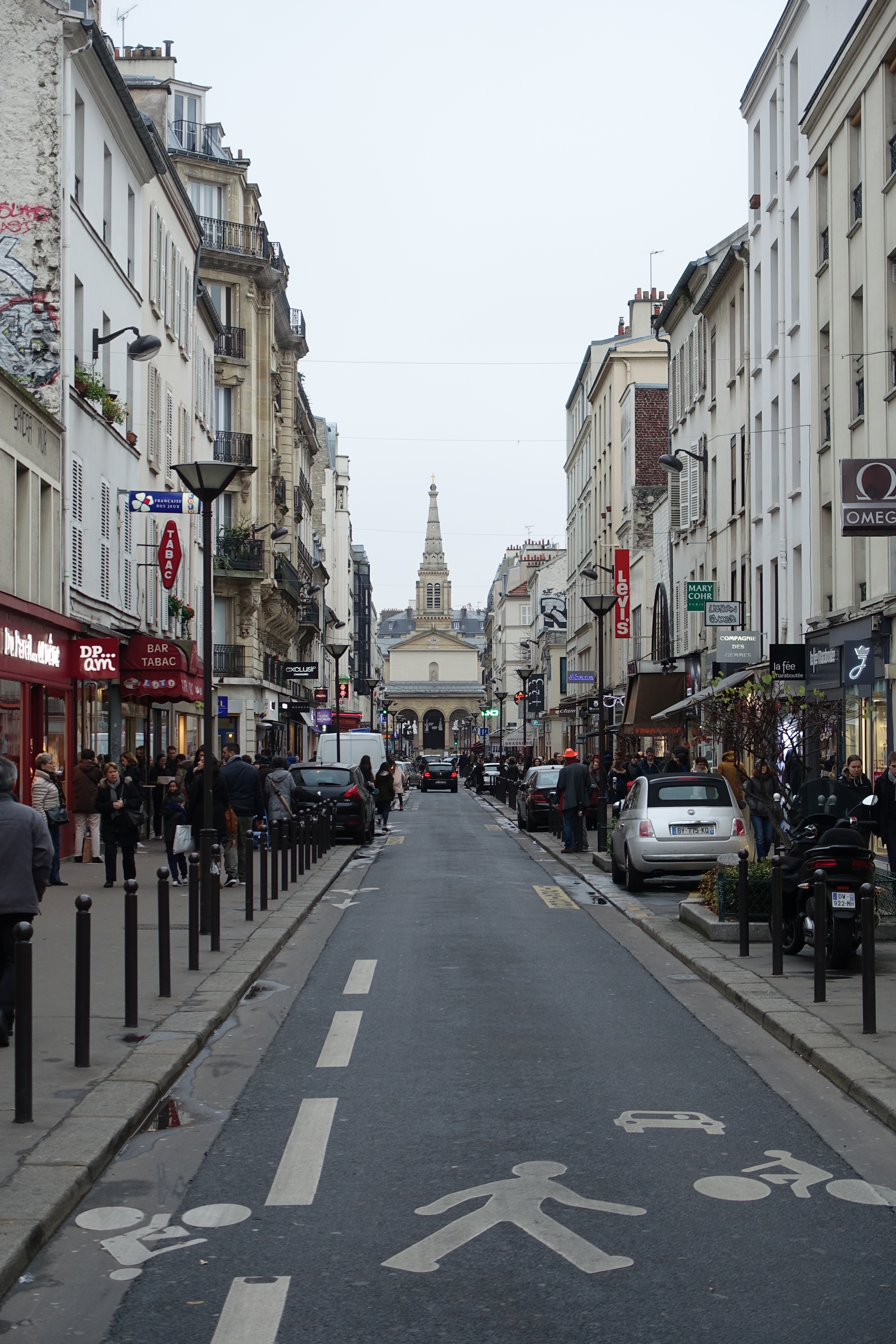
The church looks down the Rue de Commerce

== Interior ==
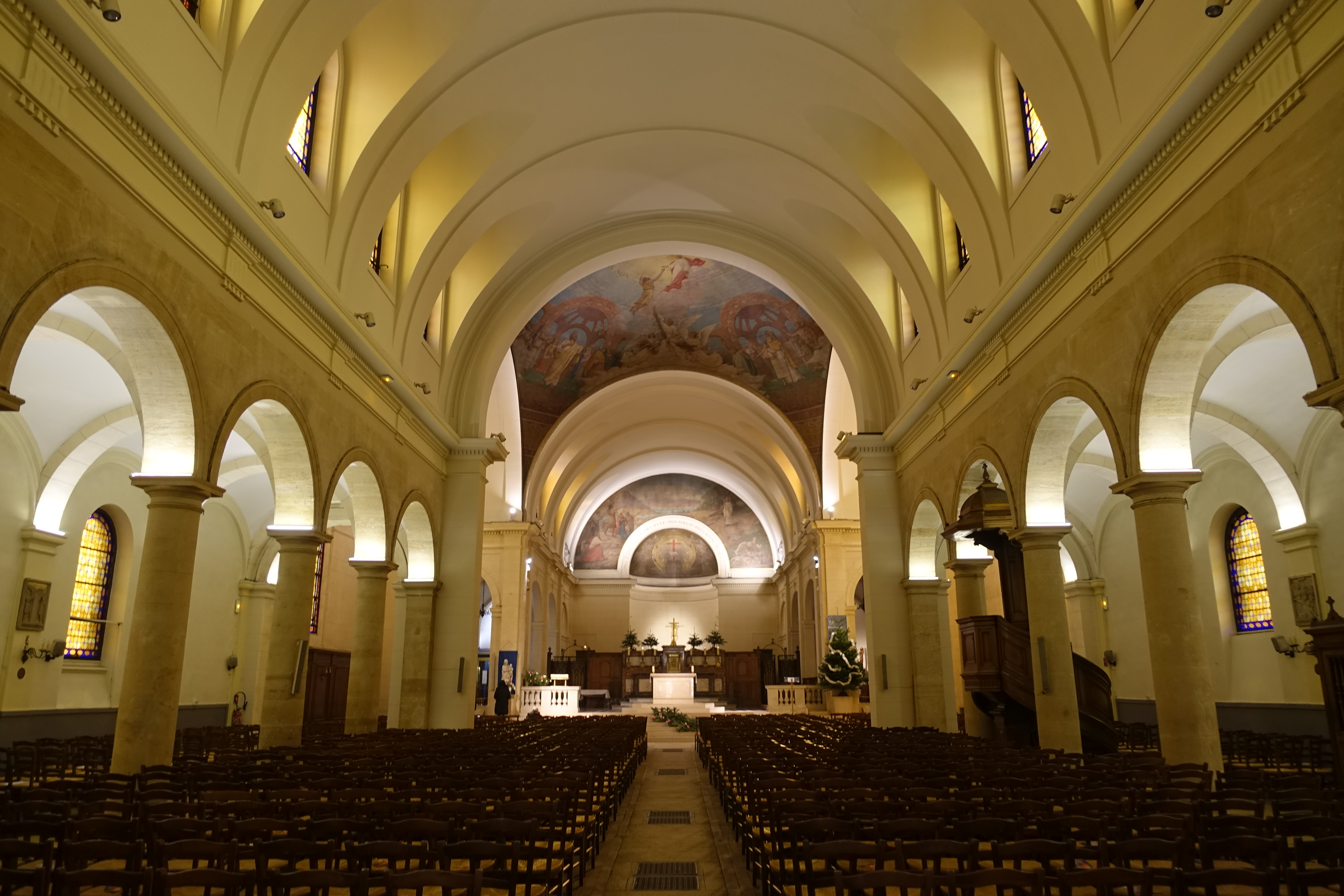
The nave facing the choir

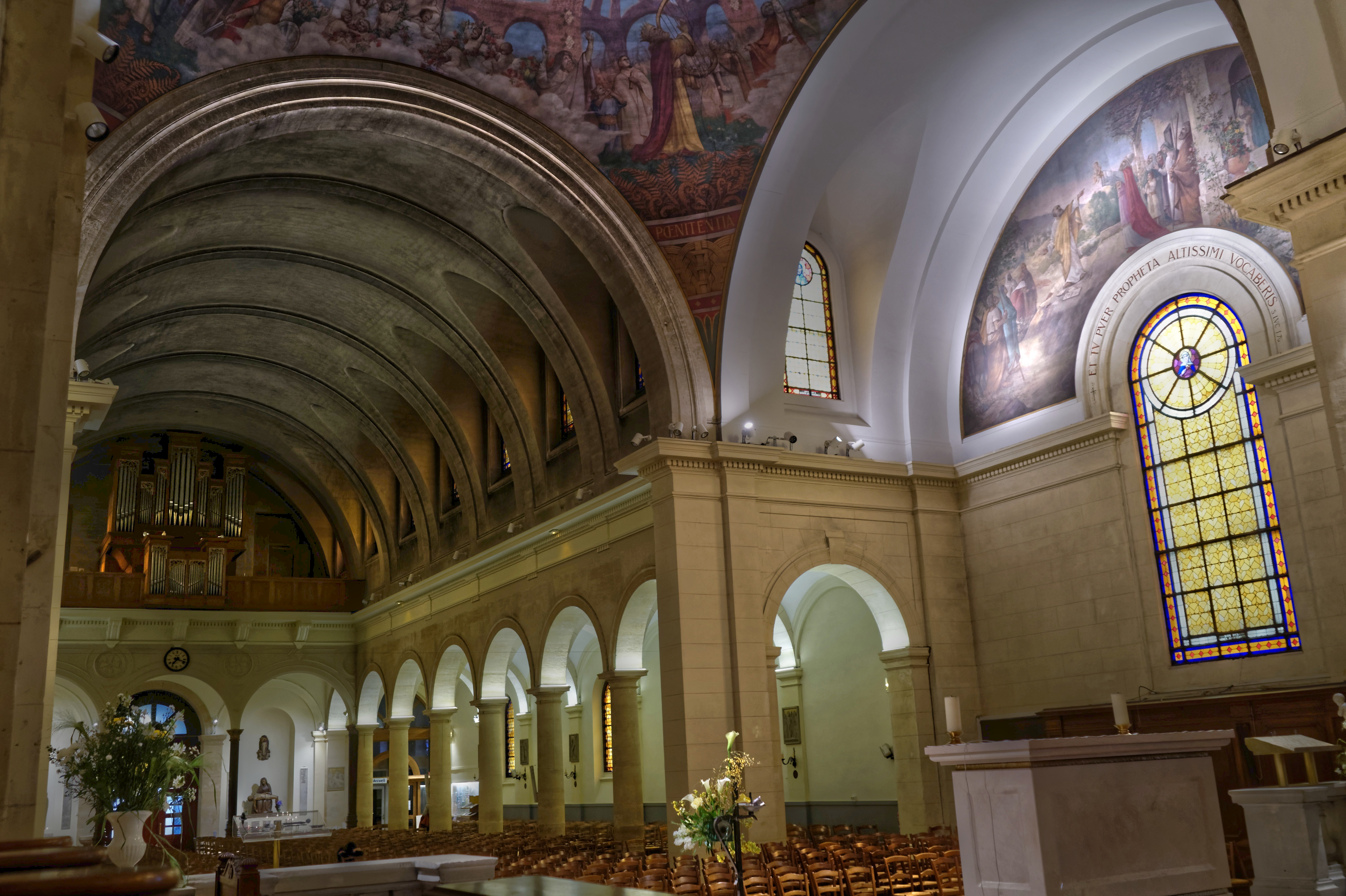
Transept and organ in the tribune

== Art and decoration ==
The decoration of the church made in 1930 included four murals, placed in the transept, in the vault over the transept, and in the arch over the axial chapel. The predominant color of the stained glass is yellow, the color in the interior is yellow. The stained glass windows of the he stained glass windows installed in 1930 and signed by Janiaud, are largely opaque and make the nave dark and the murals difficult to see, even in full daylight.

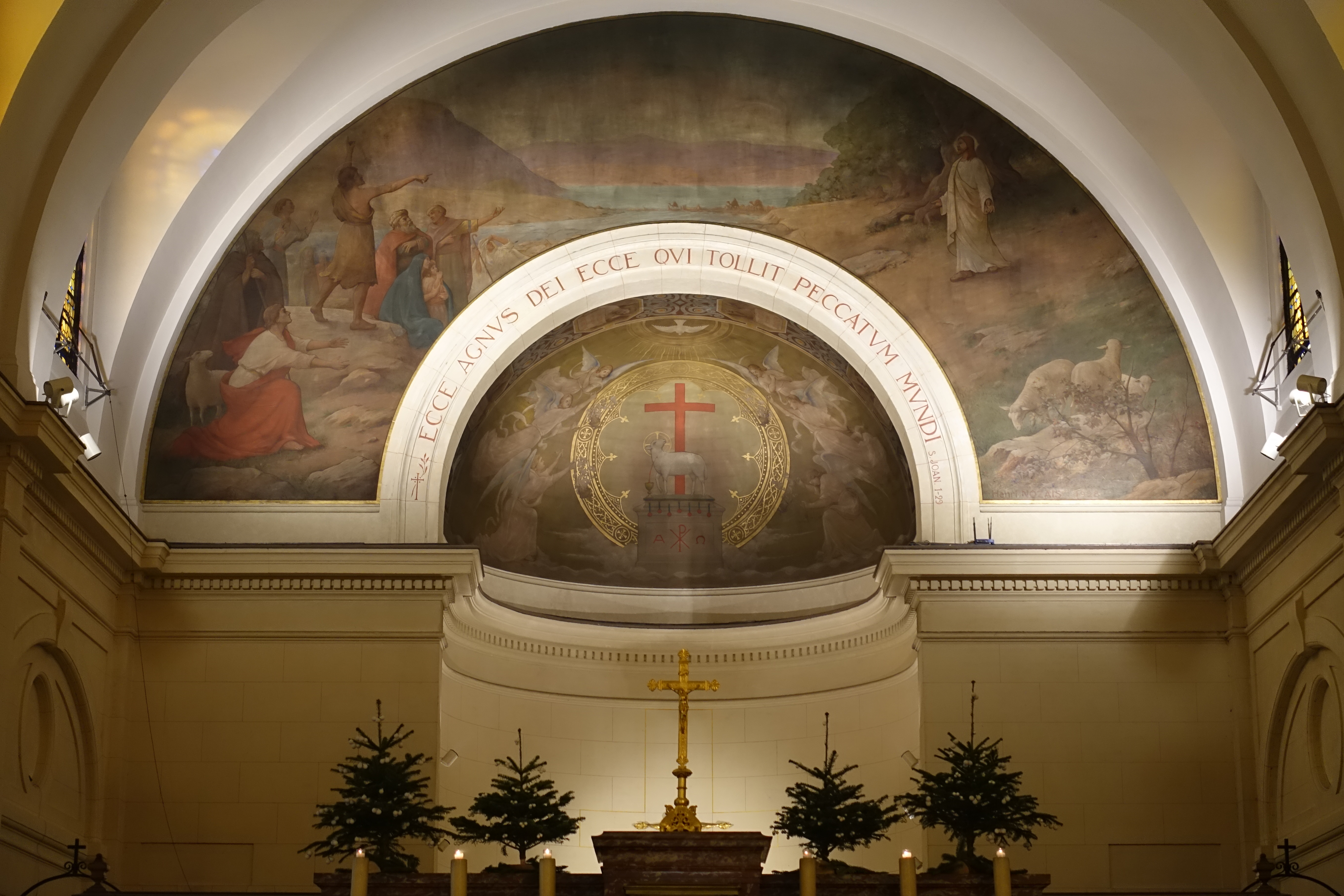
Mural in choir over the altar, "Preaching of John the Baptist by the Jordan River" (left) and "Entry of Christ into Public Life" )right) by Henri Nozais (1928)

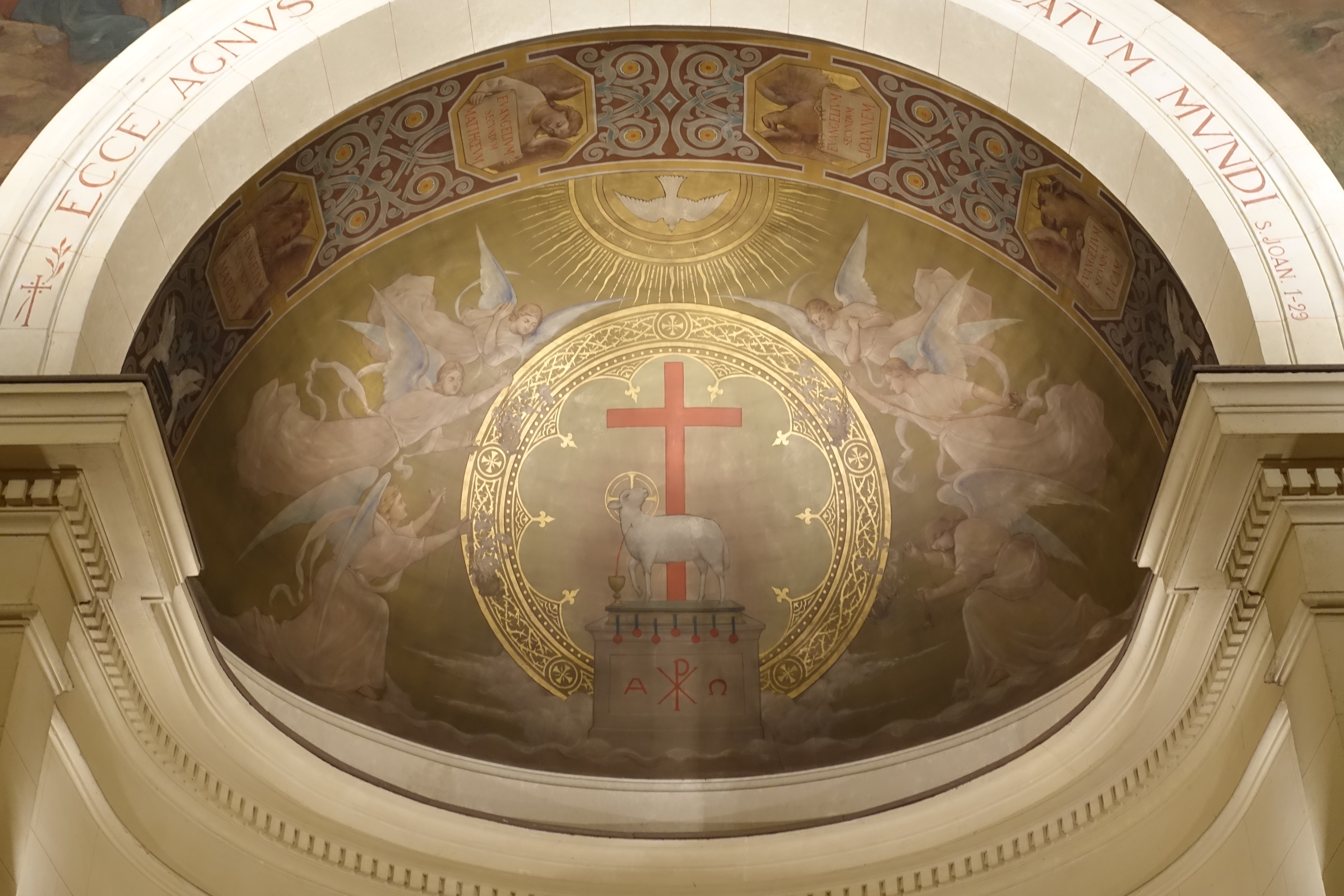
Mural in the apse vaultː "The Mystic Lamb" by Henri Nozais (1928)

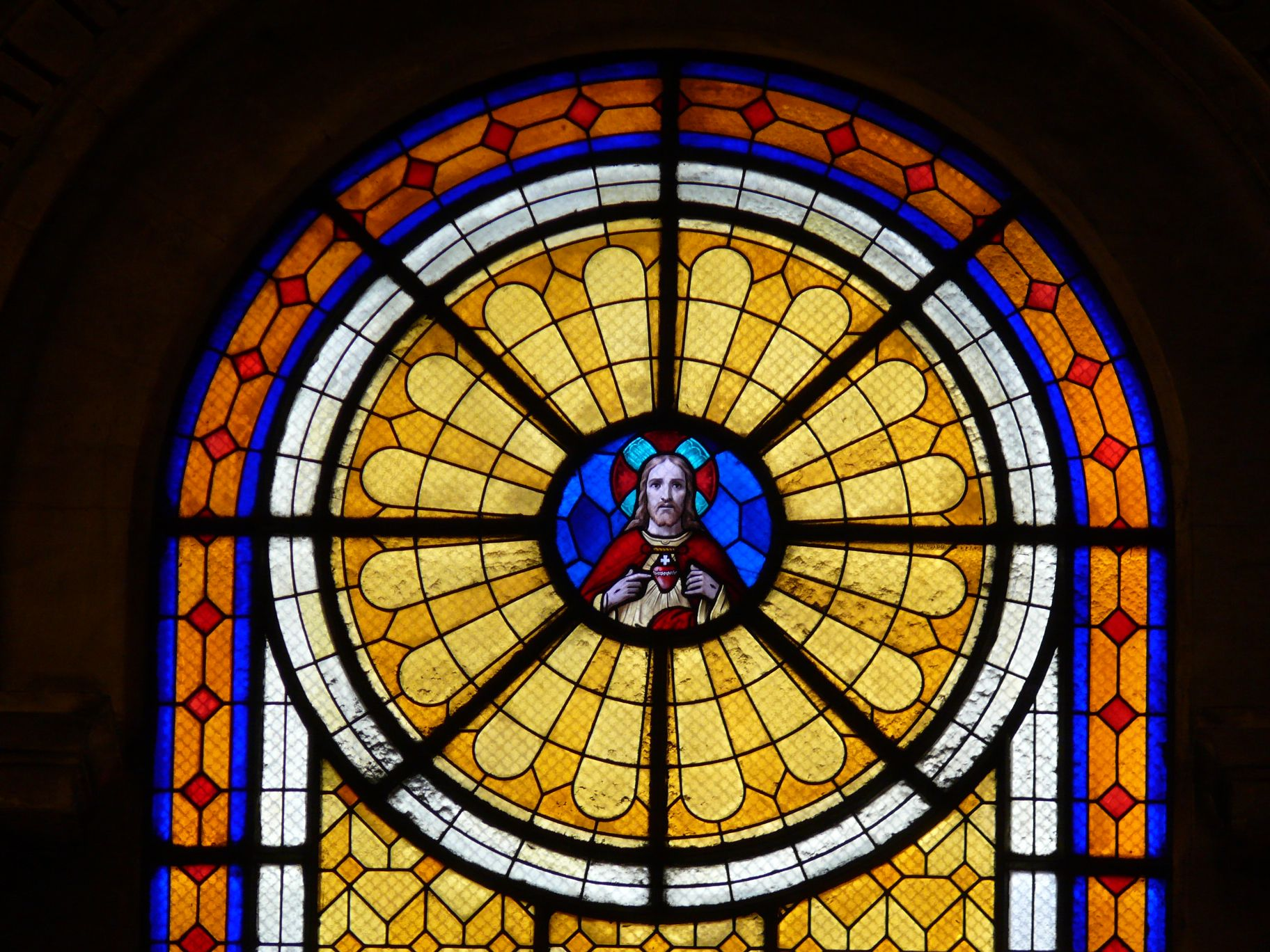
Stained glass - Christ

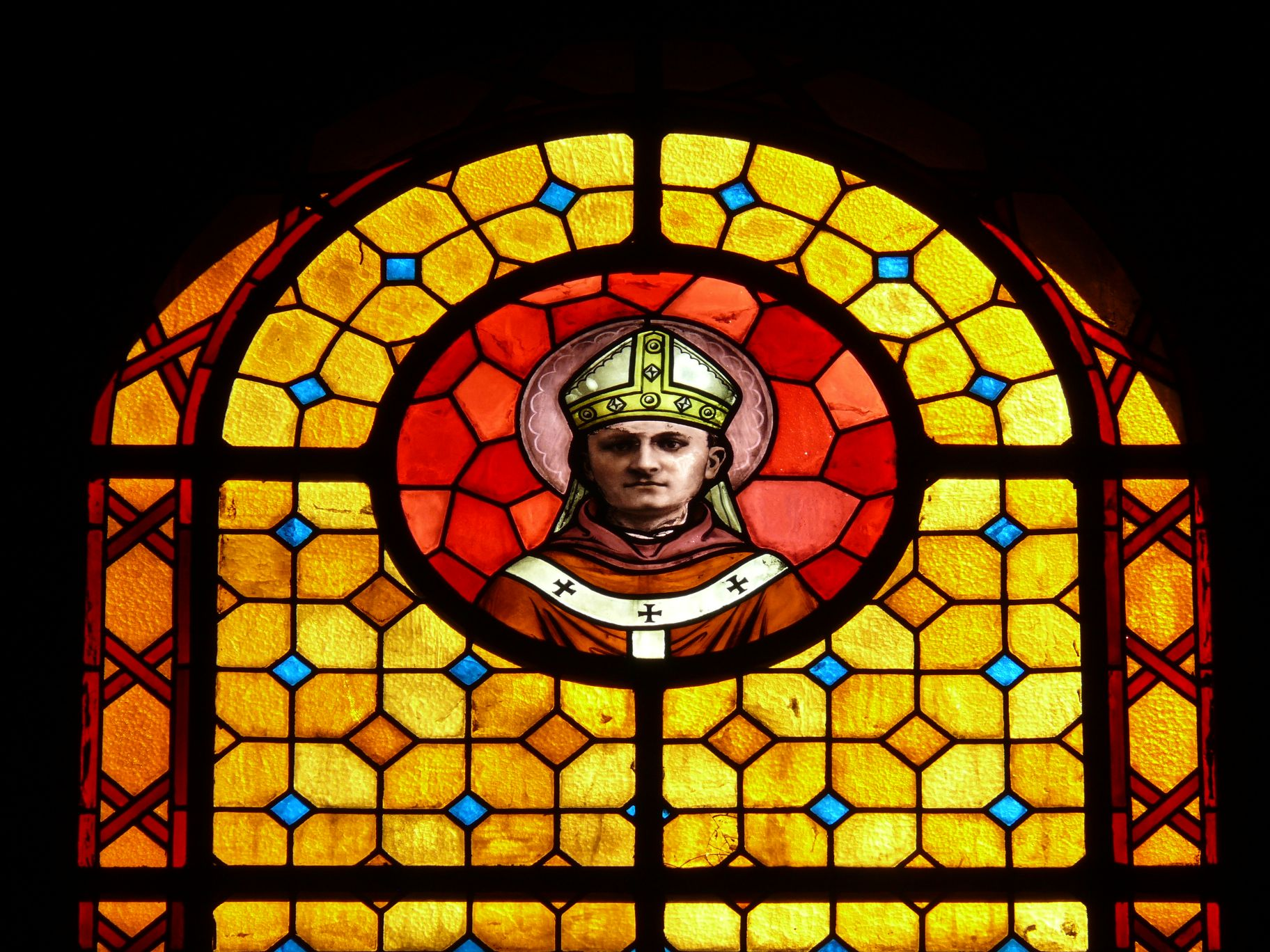
A holy Bishop, by Atelier Jeniaud (1930)

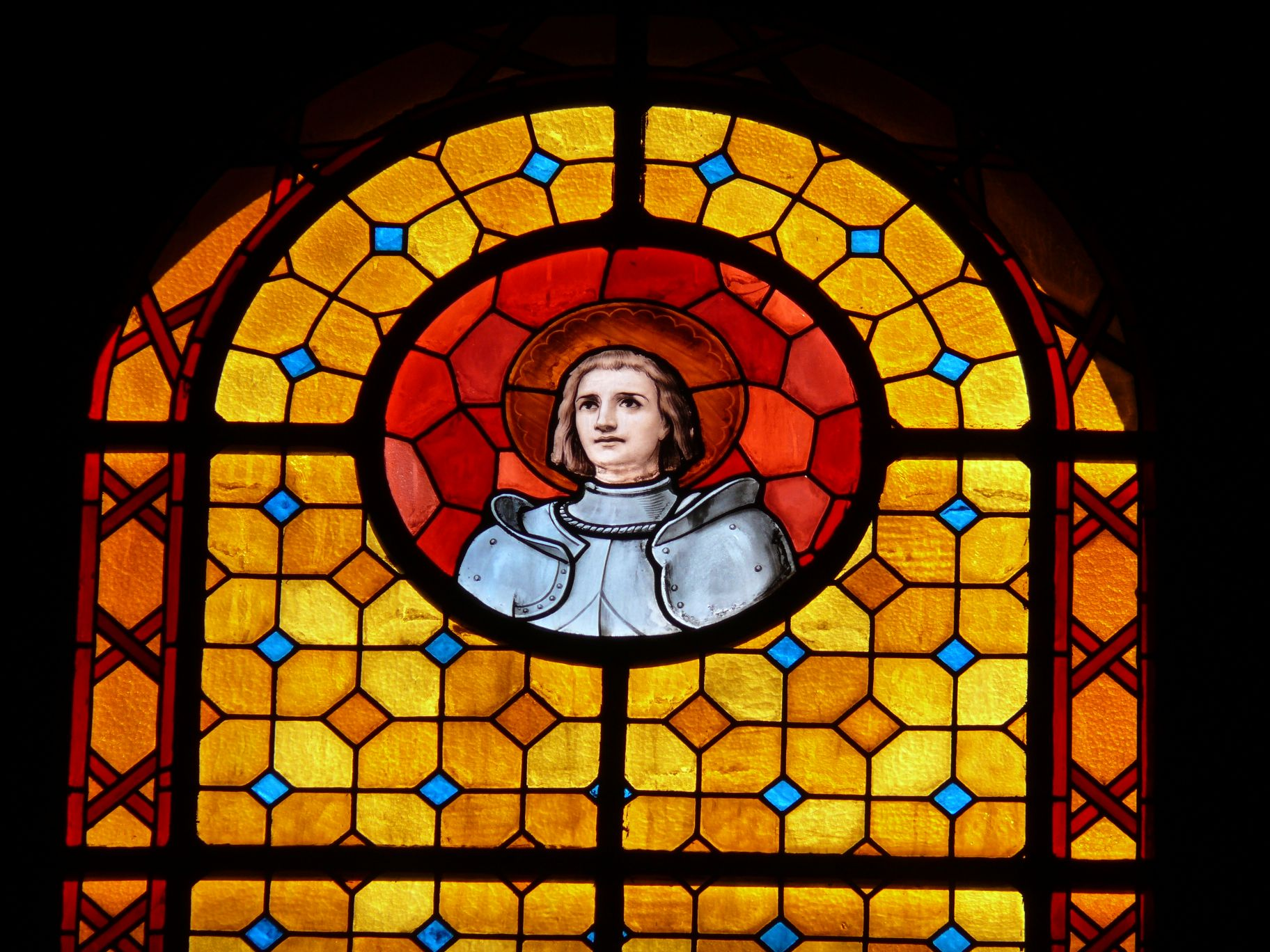
Saint John, by the Atelier Janiaud (1930s)

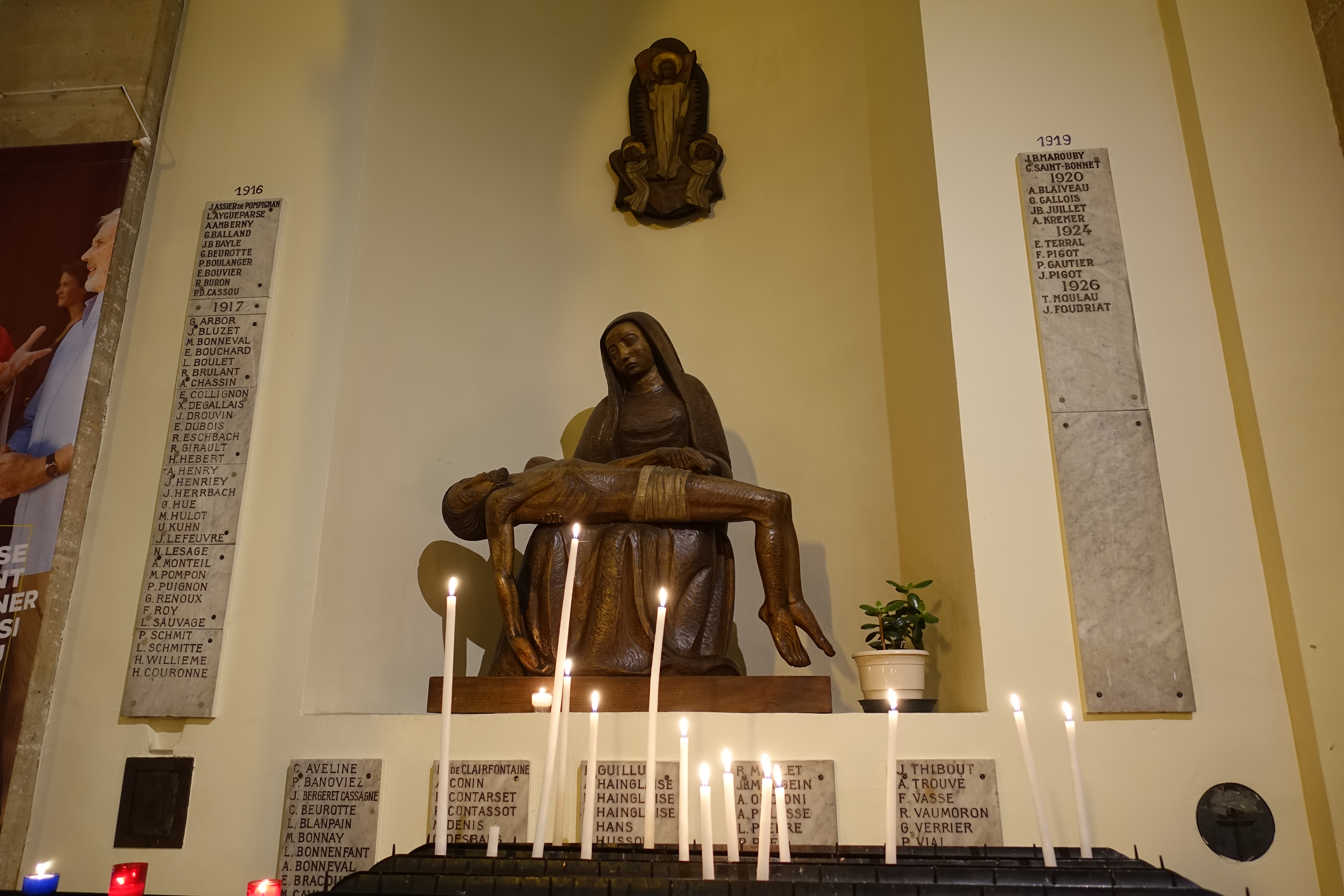
Pieta in wood carved by Gustave Dermigny (1955)

== Organ ==
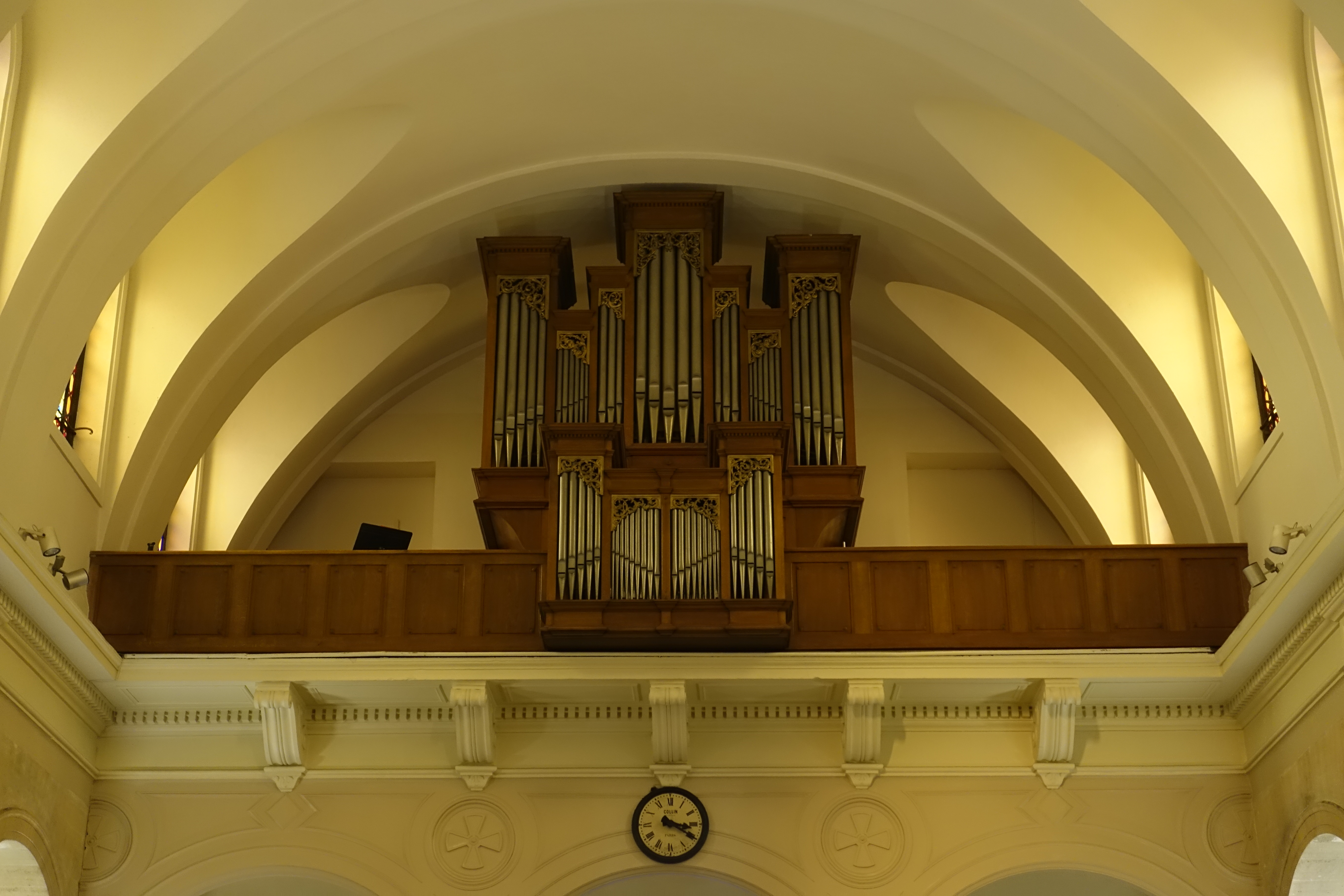

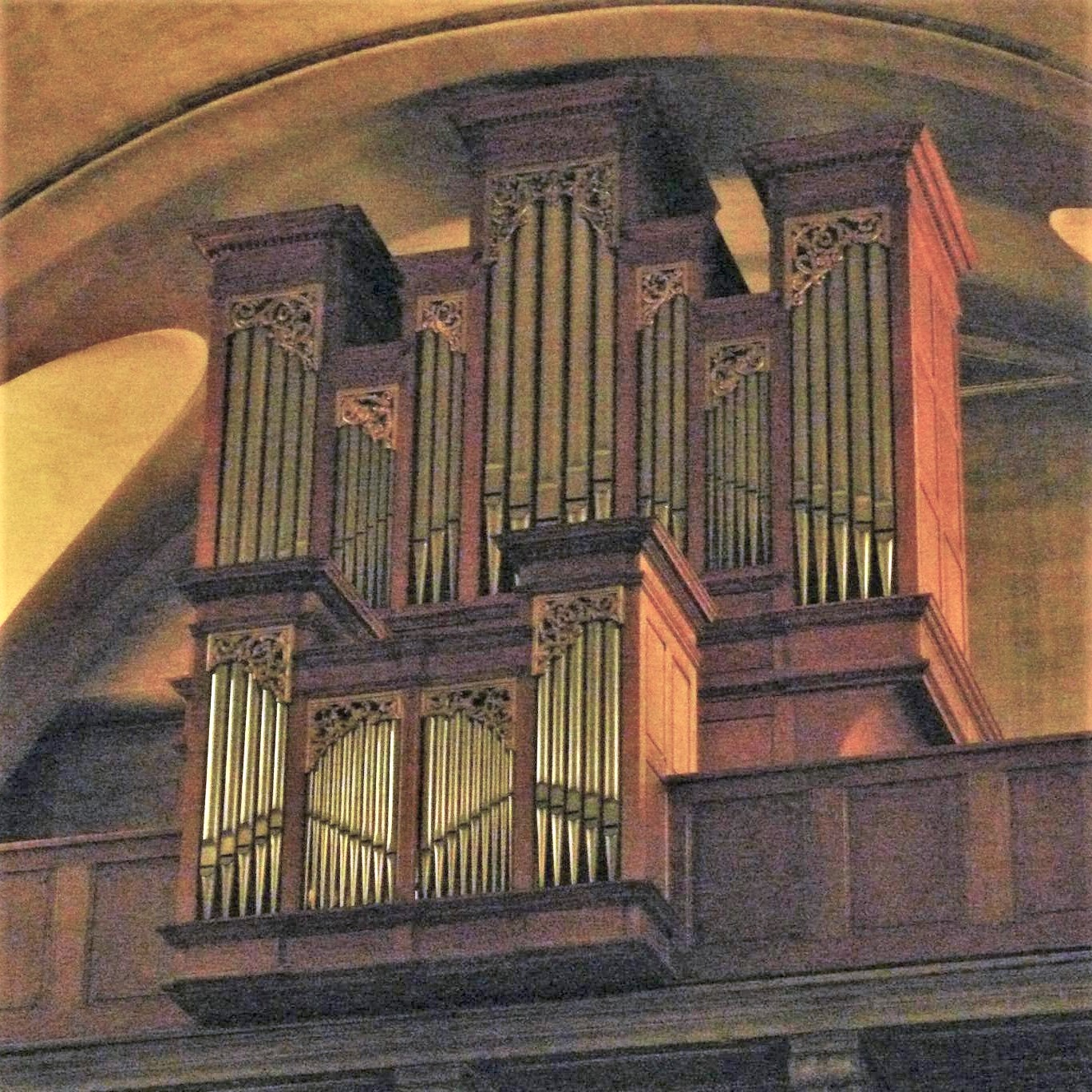

The organ in the tribune is a modern instrument, made by the firm of Haepfer in 1988 and modified by Fossaet in 2003-2004

== External sources ==
- Website of the diocese (in French)
- Website of the parish
