= Church of Saint-André-de-l'Europe =

Church in Paris, France

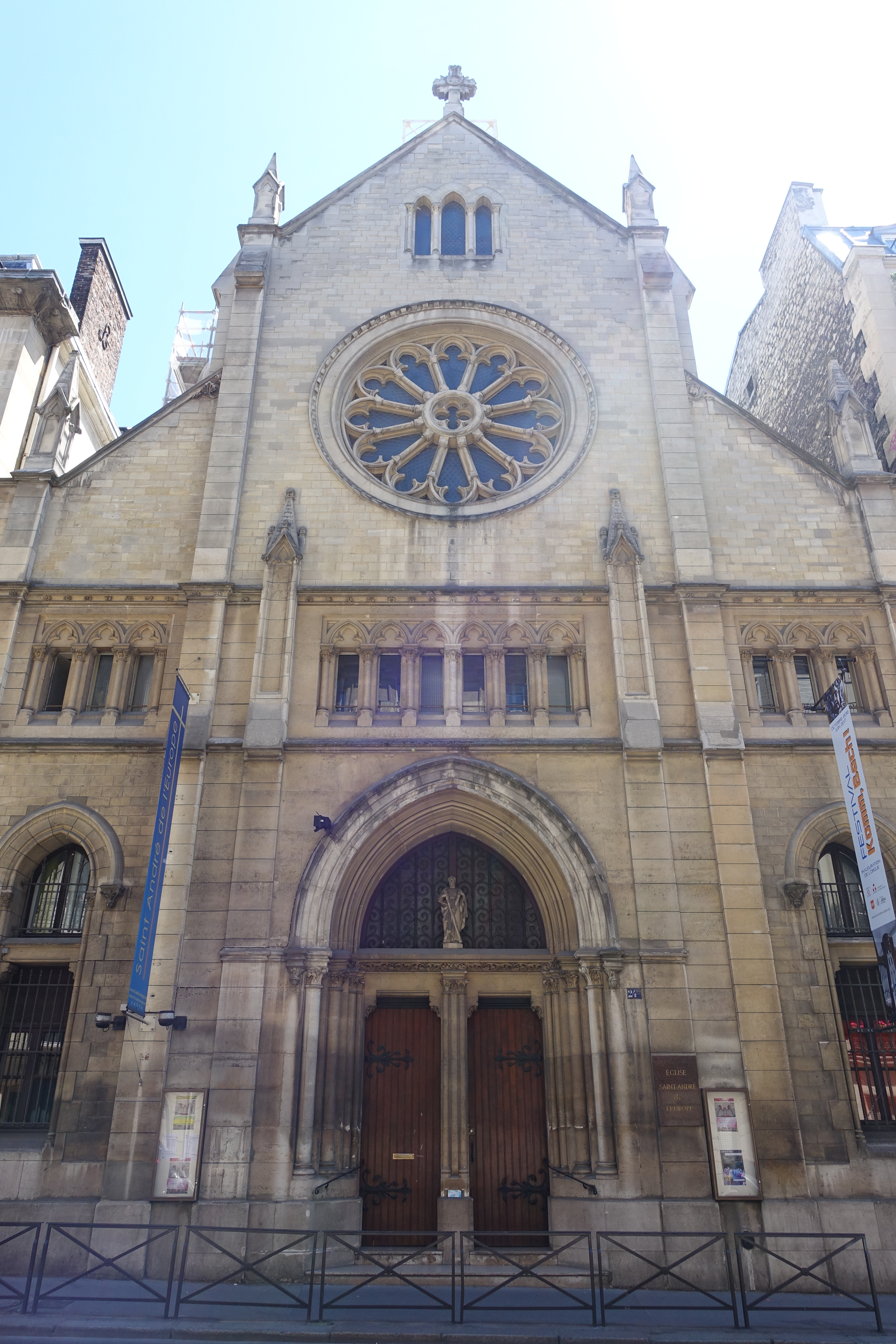

Religion
- Affiliation: Catholic
- Region: Ile de France

Location
- Country: France
- Interactive map of Church of Saint-André-de-l'Europe
- Coordinates: 48.88139°N 2.32583°E

Architecture
- Architect: Alfred Coulomb
- Style: Neo Gothic

The Catholic church Saint-André-de-l'Europe is located at 24 Rue de Saint-Pétersbourg in the 8th arrondissement of Paris. The main building was constructed between 1876 and 1900.

A chapel was constructed in 1860 by the architect Lucien Douillard for the convent of the Missionary Oblates of Mary Immaculate. It was suppressed, but in 1959 was established as a parish church and dedicated to St. Andrew of Europe.

As with the vast majority of Catholic Churches in Paris, it follows the Latin Rite and is subject to the Archdiocese of Paris.

== See also ==
- List of churches in Paris
