= Théodore Ballu =

French architect

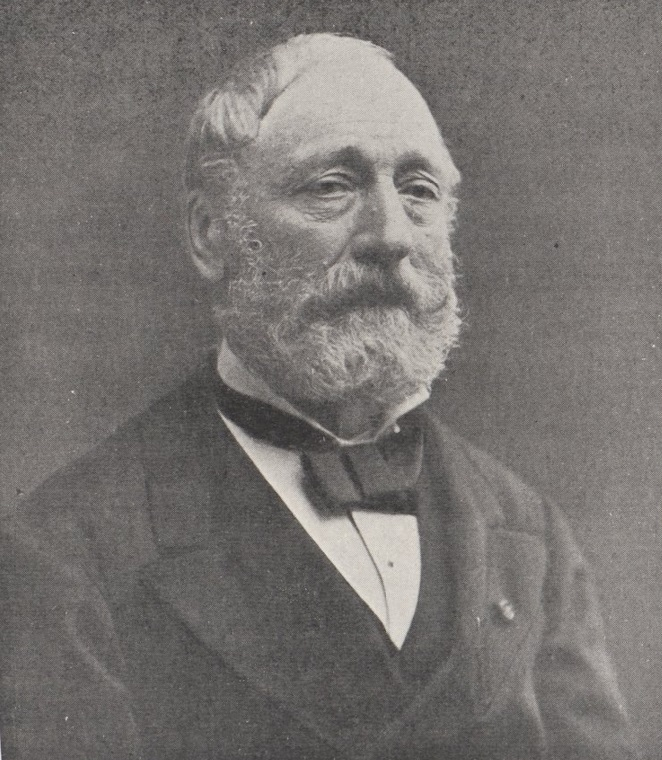
Théodore Ballu (date unknown)

Théodore Ballu (8 June 1817 – 22 May 1885) was a French architect who designed numerous public buildings in Paris . He is the grandfather of the industrialist and politician Guillaume Ballu.

== Winning the Prix de Rome ==
In 1840, Théodore Ballu won the Prix de Rome. That year competition's final challenge was to design a palace for the Chambre des Pairs. Ballu designed the Église de la Trinité and directed the reconstruction of the Hôtel de ville, the city hall building in Paris, after a fire destroyed much of the original building..

The young laureate then left Paris and boarded at the Académie de France à Rome. He lived in the Villa Médicis from January 1841 to December 1845. He visited the ruins of Ancient Greece and his third year there was dedicated to Pompeii. In 1844–1845, his projects focused on the Érechthéion de l’Acropole d’Athènes.

== Architecture in Paris ==
Back in France, Théodore Ballu became an assistant to architect Franz Christian Gau on the Basilique Sainte-Clotilde construction site, then took charge after Gau's death in 1853. From then on, his career was much focused on his preference for religious buildings.

In 1860, he was named chief architect of Parisian buildings related to the religion. He then designed the Église de la Trinité (1861–1867), the Saint-Esprit temple on Rue Roquépine, and the churches of Saint-Ambroise (1863–1869) and Saint-Joseph (1866–1875).

He also directed the Saint-Jacques Tower restoration (1854–1858) and the construction of the Saint-Denis church in Argenteuil (1866).

L’Eglise de la Trinité is very emblematic of his work because it demonstrates his extensive knowledge of various architecture styles, his passion for eclecticism, which was very popular at the time, his tendency to incorporate numerous sculpted or painted decorations and his in-depth knowledge of cost-efficient construction. The Trinité area became the architect's favorite place, where he owned several properties and designed his home.

== The Saint-Germain-l’Auxerrois belfry ==
From 1858 to 1863, Théodore Ballu designed and created the belfry of the Saint-Germain-l’Auxerrois church. The area had not yet been completely transformed by Haussmann’s renovation of Paris. The ancient parish church of the French monarchs was still concealed behind buildings that separated it from the colonnade of the Palais du Louvre. In 1859, architect Jacques Hittorff began the construction of a new building in the north to house the city council of the 1st arrondissement, which reproduced a large part of the church’s facade and was inspired by Gothic and French Renaissance architecture.

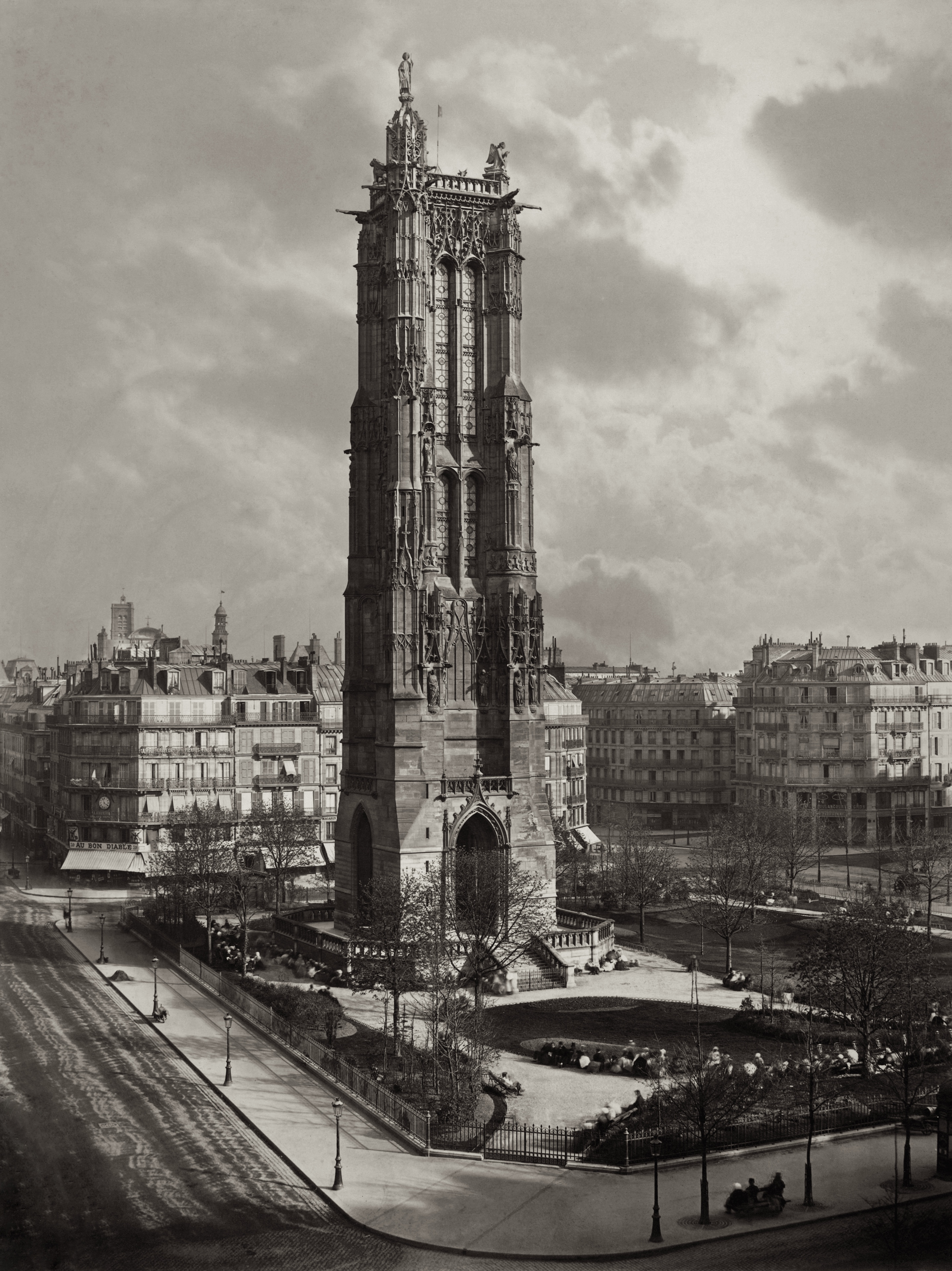
Saint-Jacques Tower circa 1867, restored by Ballu between (1854–58)

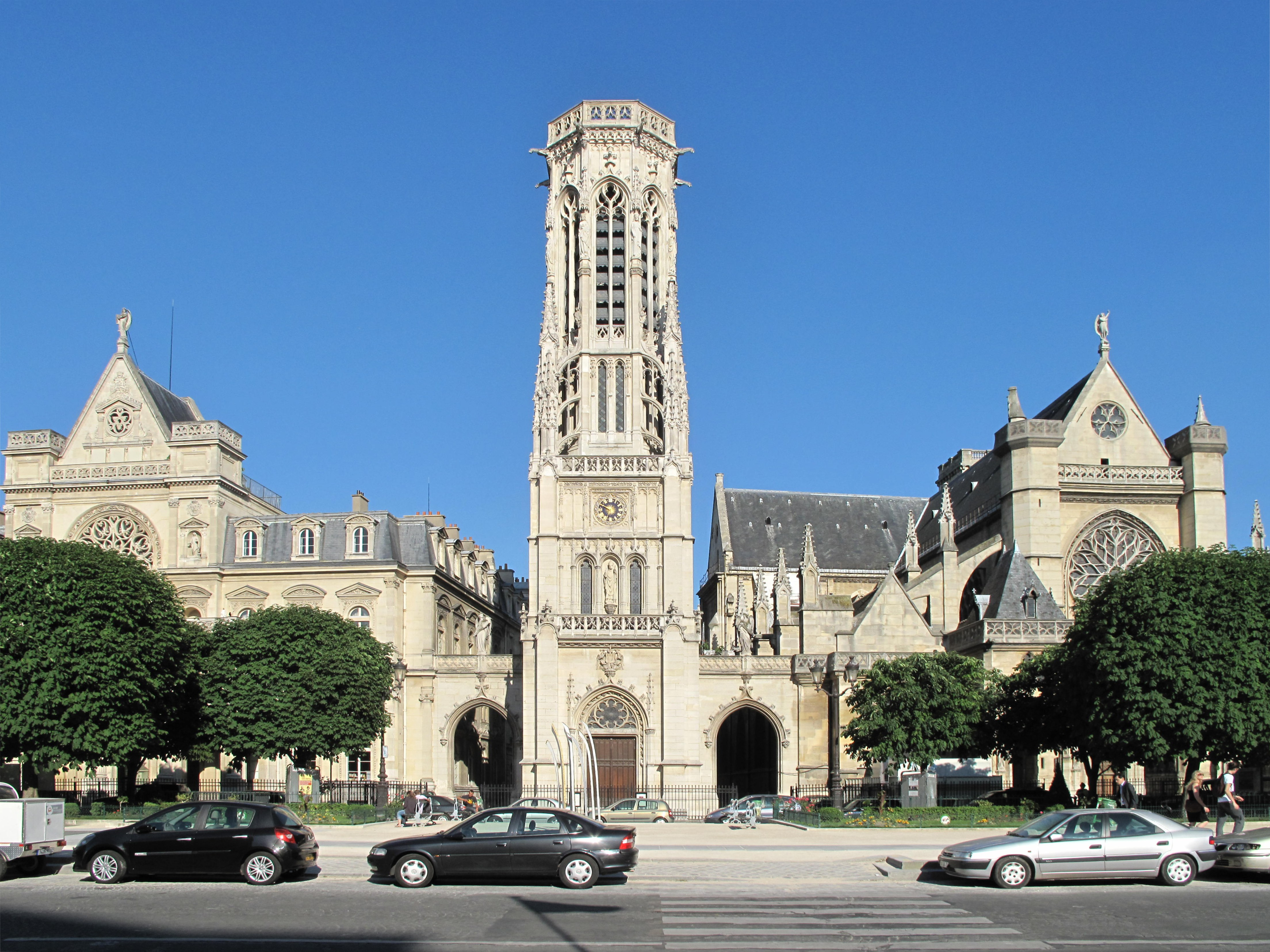
The belfry of Saint-Germain-l'Auxerrois (1858–63)

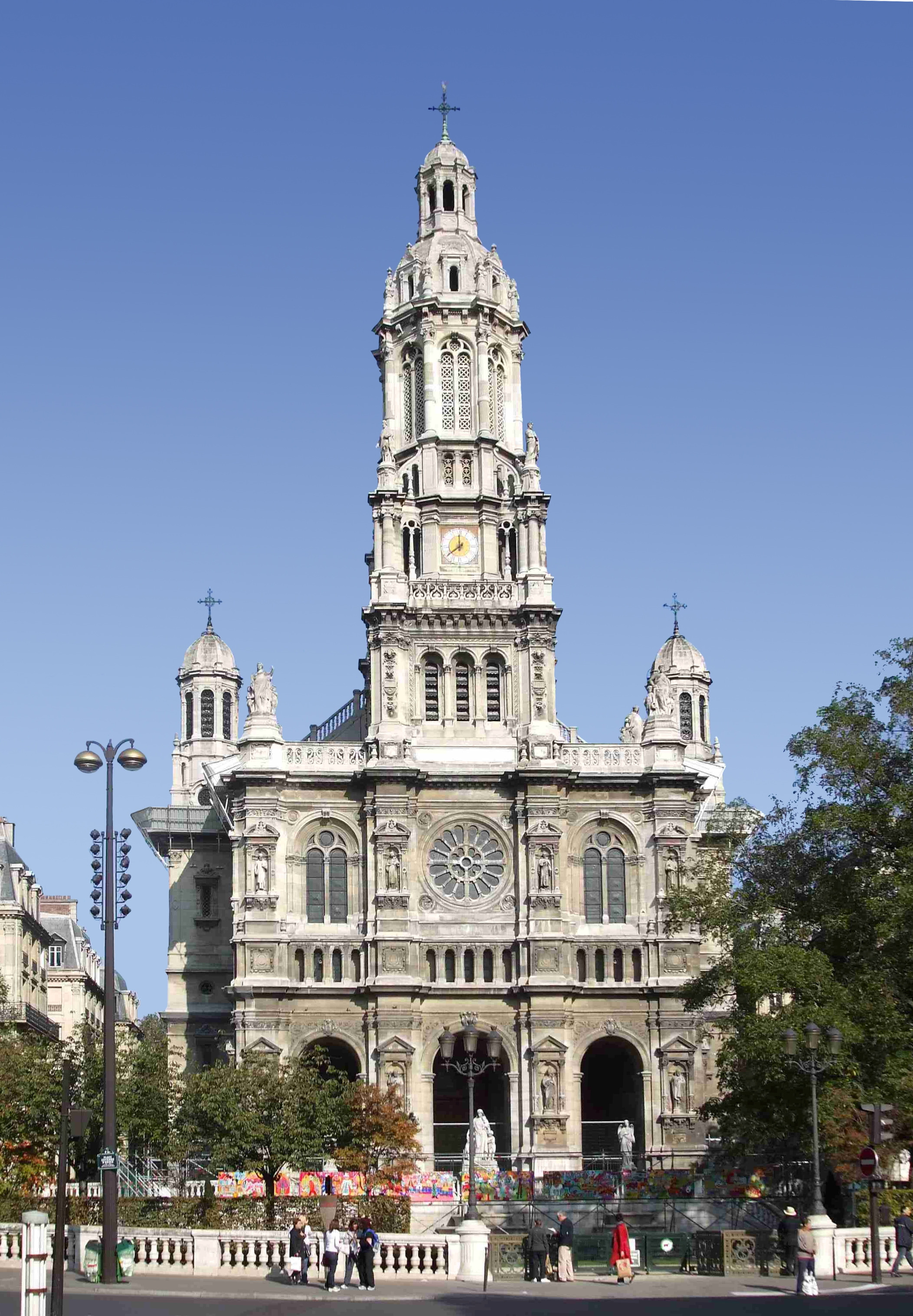
Église de la Sainte-Trinité, Paris (1861–67)

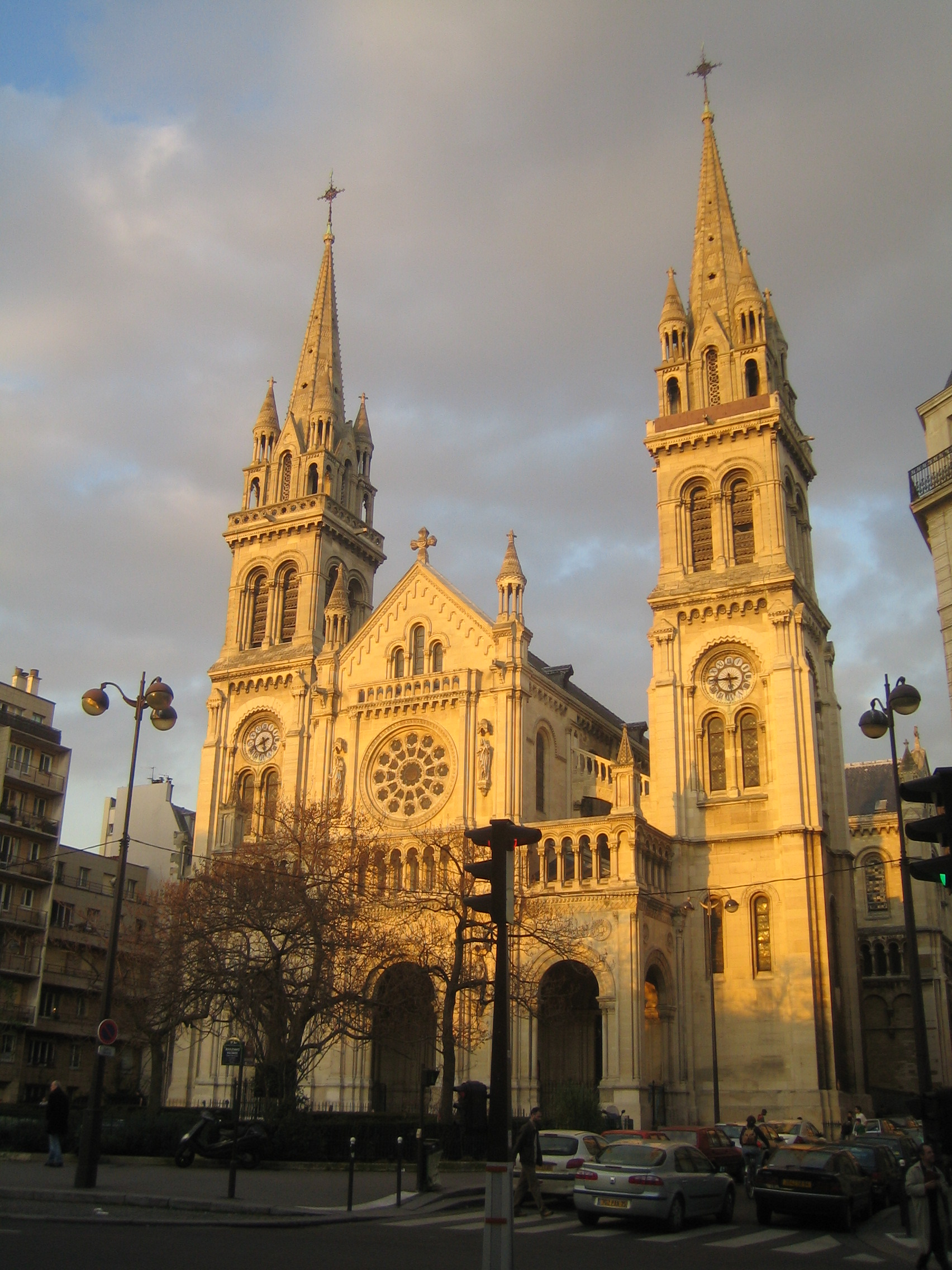
Église Saint-Ambroise, Paris (1863–69)
