= Jean Chastellain =

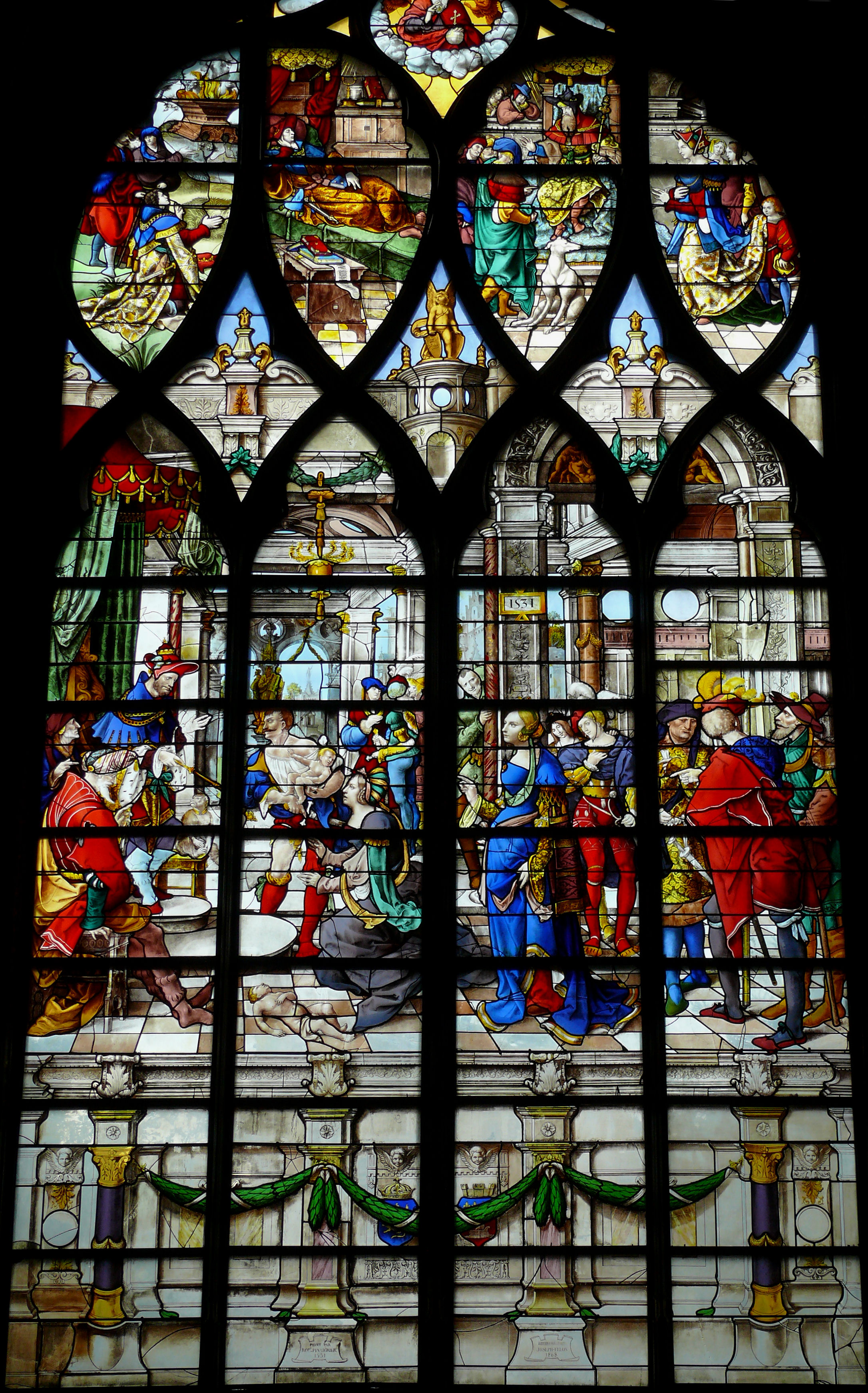
- The Wisdom of Solomon stained glass window by Chastellain in Saint-Gervais-Saint-Protais
- Born: 1490
- Died: September - December 1541
- Notable work: Wisdom of Solomon stained glass window
- Spouse: Anne Hémon
- Children: Jacques

Jean Chastellain (1490–1541) was a master glassmaker of the French Renaissance.

== Biography ==
The expert glassmaker appears in records for the first time in the royal building sites of the chapel of Fontainebleau and in Villers-Cotterêts in 1527. He worked on these sites in competition with Jean de La Hamée who had been received as a master in 1526, and who obtained orders for Fontainebleau, Villers-Cotterêts, and the Château de Madrid between 1528 and 1535. de La Hamée later died in 1562.

He produced stained glass windows for the Church of Saint-Germain-l'Auxerrois and the Church of Saint-Étienne-du-Mont in Paris, as well as many other stained-glass windows including The Wisdom of Solomon in the Church of Saint-Gervais-Saint-Protais in Paris. Today, one can also see several of his stained glass windows in the Château d'Écouen. His models or illustrations were sometimes repeated several times.

Jean Chastellain was commissioned in 1528 for work at the Château de Chantilly by the de Montmorency family.

To give Jean Chastellain the realization of the stained glass windows hitherto attributed to the "Maître de Montmorency", it is necessary to distinguish between a young Jean Chastellain influenced by the Flemish or German school, and Jean Chastellain of maturity influenced by the French and Italian schools, especially by Raphael.

After his death, the activity of his workshop continued with Laurent Marchant, who married his widow in 1543. Nicolas Beaurain is also believed to have succeeded Jean Chastellain after his death, with the King's Buildings, and the windows of the Sainte-Chapelle de Vincennes.

== Works ==
About thirty works have been attributed to him.

For certain works, the name of Jean Chastellain appears in contracts; for others, the attribution was made by stylistic comparison. Jean Lafond attributed to him the stained glass window of the Canaanite Prayer in the cathedral of Bayonne, and the stained glass window of the Incredulity of Saint Thomas in the Saint-Aspais church in Melun. Fragments of stained glass depicting scenes from the life of Christ in the Musée d'Écouen are attributed to him. The attributions are delicate because he worked from cartoons that were made by painters with different styles. Noël Bellemare is mentioned in the contract for the south rose window of the Saint-Germain-l'Auxerrois church in Paris.

Art historians have made stylistic comparisons between the Renaissance windows of the Saint-Martin de Montmorency collegiate church, the Church of Saint-Martin in Triel-sur-Seine, the chapel of the Virgin of the Saint-Gervais church -Saint-Protais in Paris, from the Saint-Aspais church in Melun from the Abbey of Ferrieres by attributing the cartoons to a painter of Flemish origin active in Paris. For the collegiate church of Montmorency, this painter was given the conventional name of "Maître de Montmorency". Guy-Michel Leproux proposed the name of Gaultier or Gauthier de Campes, originally from Bruges, but, with members of his family in Tournai, settled in Paris before 1500 who would have provided the cartoons for the stained glass windows made by Jean Chastellain and his workshop. Gauthier de Campes also provided cartoons for tapestries.

=== Church of Saint-Merry in Paris ===
- Fragments of the glass roof of the Life of Saint Agnes, circa 1510.

=== Church of Saint-Gervais-Saint-Protais in Paris ===
- five stained glass windows of the Life of the Virgin, dated 1517.
- Wisdom of Solomon stained glass window, in 1531 (pictured below)
Stained-Glass Window: The Wisdom of Solomon
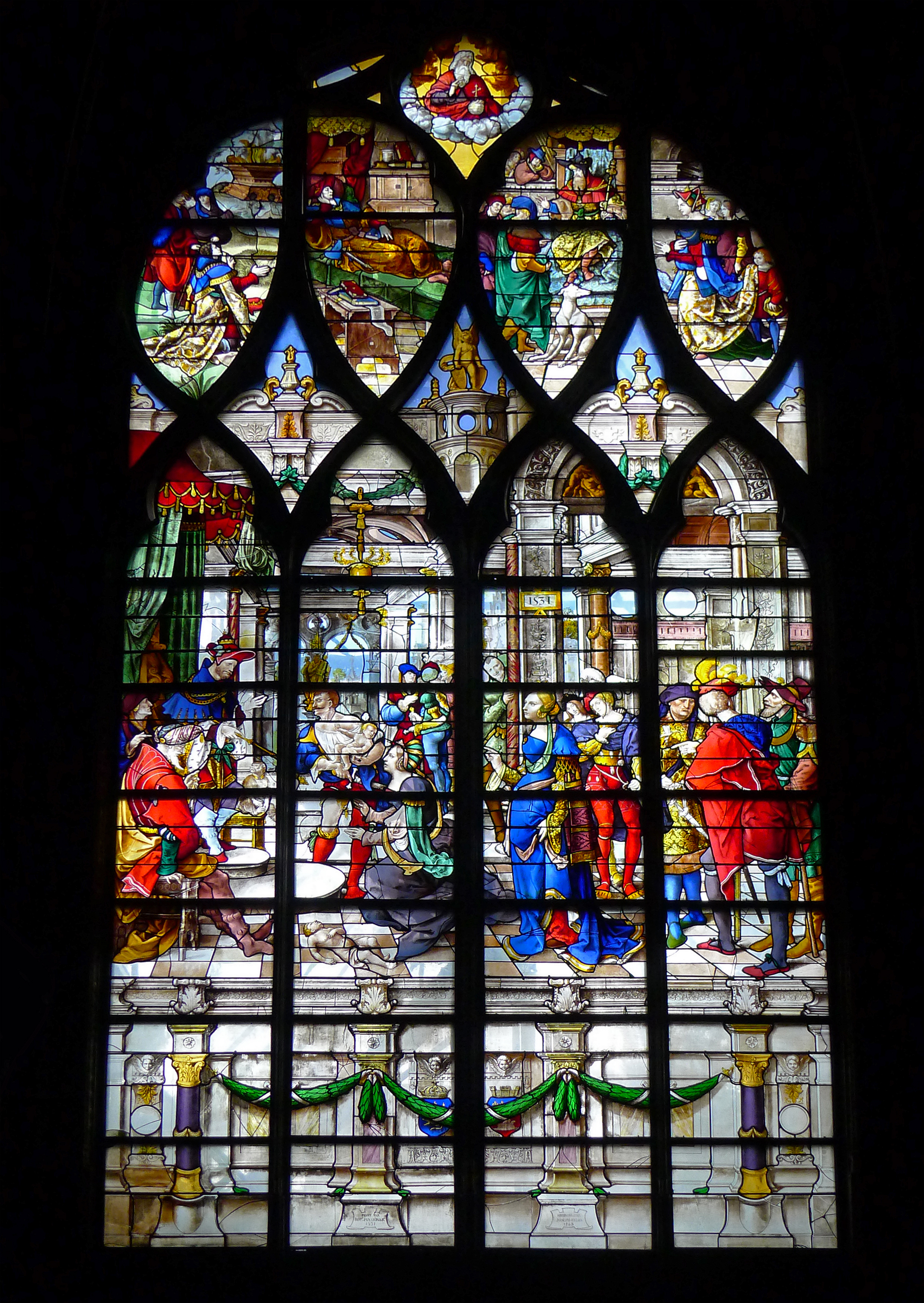
Full window

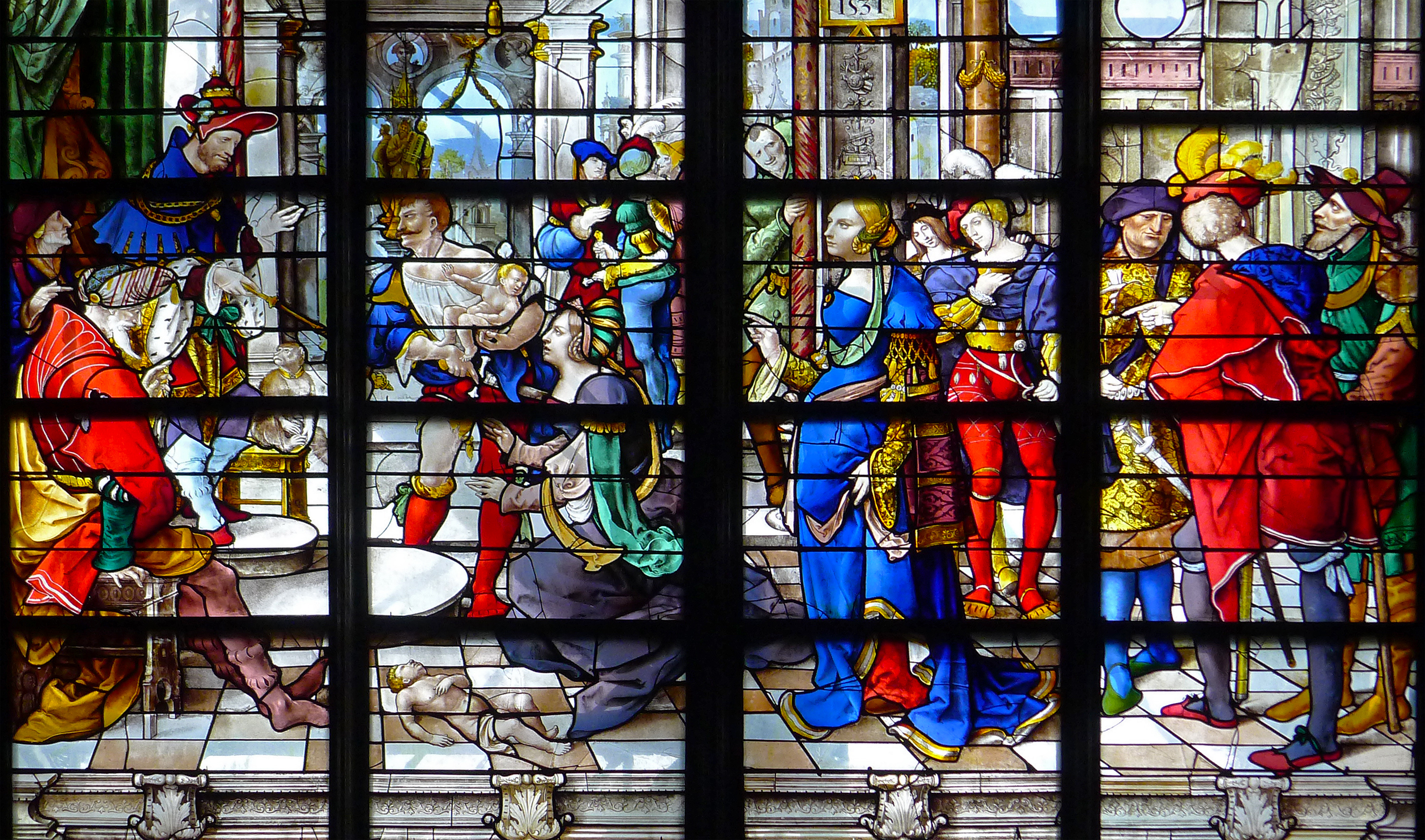
Central part: Judgement of Solomon

=== Bayonne Cathedral ===
- Stained glass window of the Canaanite Prayer, in 1531.

=== Church of Saint-Aspais in Melun ===
- Stained glass window of the Incredulity of Saint Thomas in the upper register of a glass roof, in 1532.

=== Church of Saint-Germain-l'Auxerrois ===
- Southern Rose of the Holy Spirit, ordered on September 18, 1532, by Antoine Le Viste and Charlotte Briconnet, his wife, on a cartoon by the painter Noël Bellemare;
- stained glass window of the Incredulity of Saint Thomas in the transept, in 1533, commissioned by General of Finance Antoine Bohier.

=== Church of Saint-Jean-Baptiste de Nemours ===
- stained glass window of the Baptism of Christ, circa 1530-1535
- stained glass window of the offering of the relics of Saint John the Baptist, the lower part of which was redone in 1860
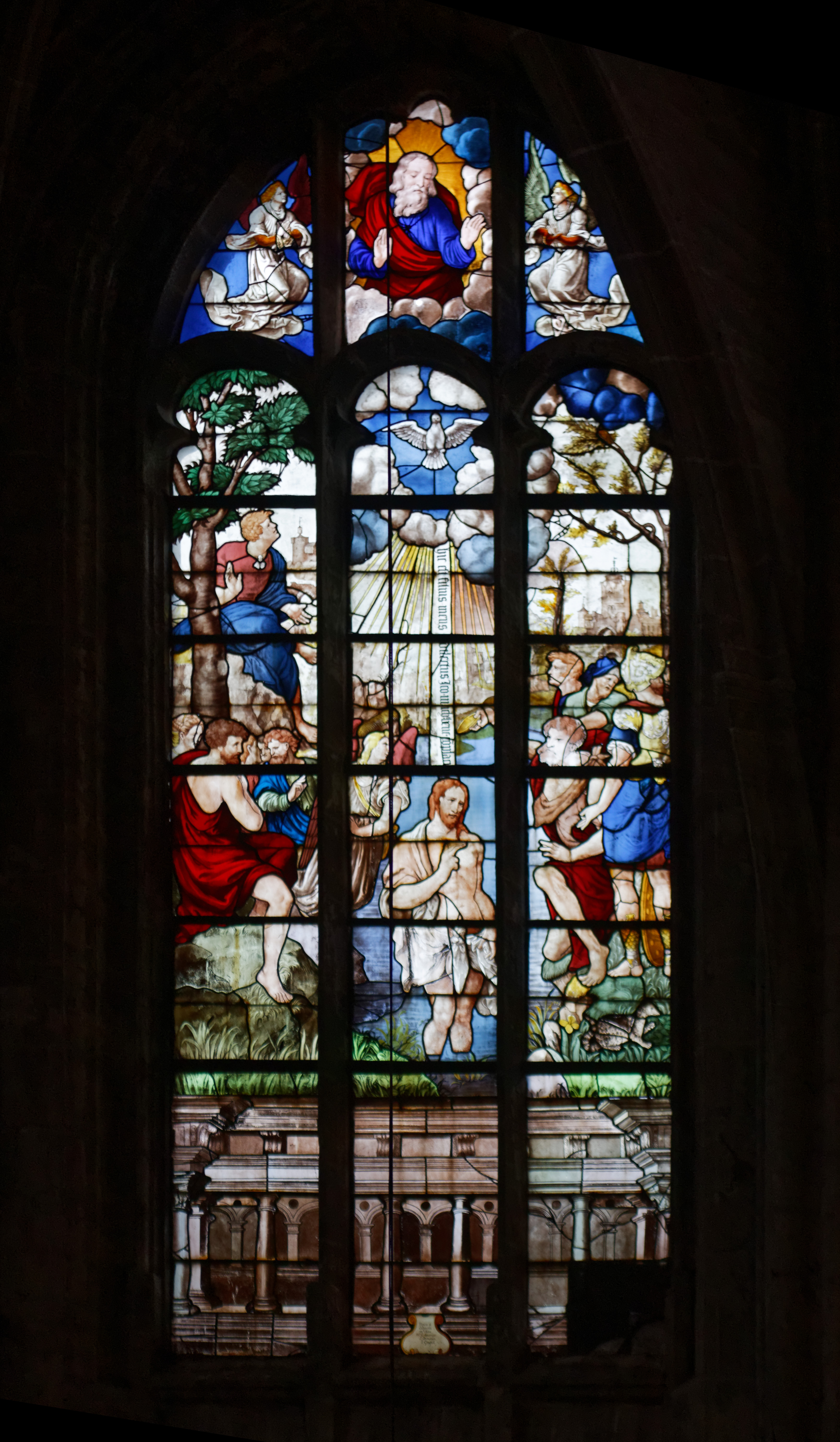
Baptism of Christ

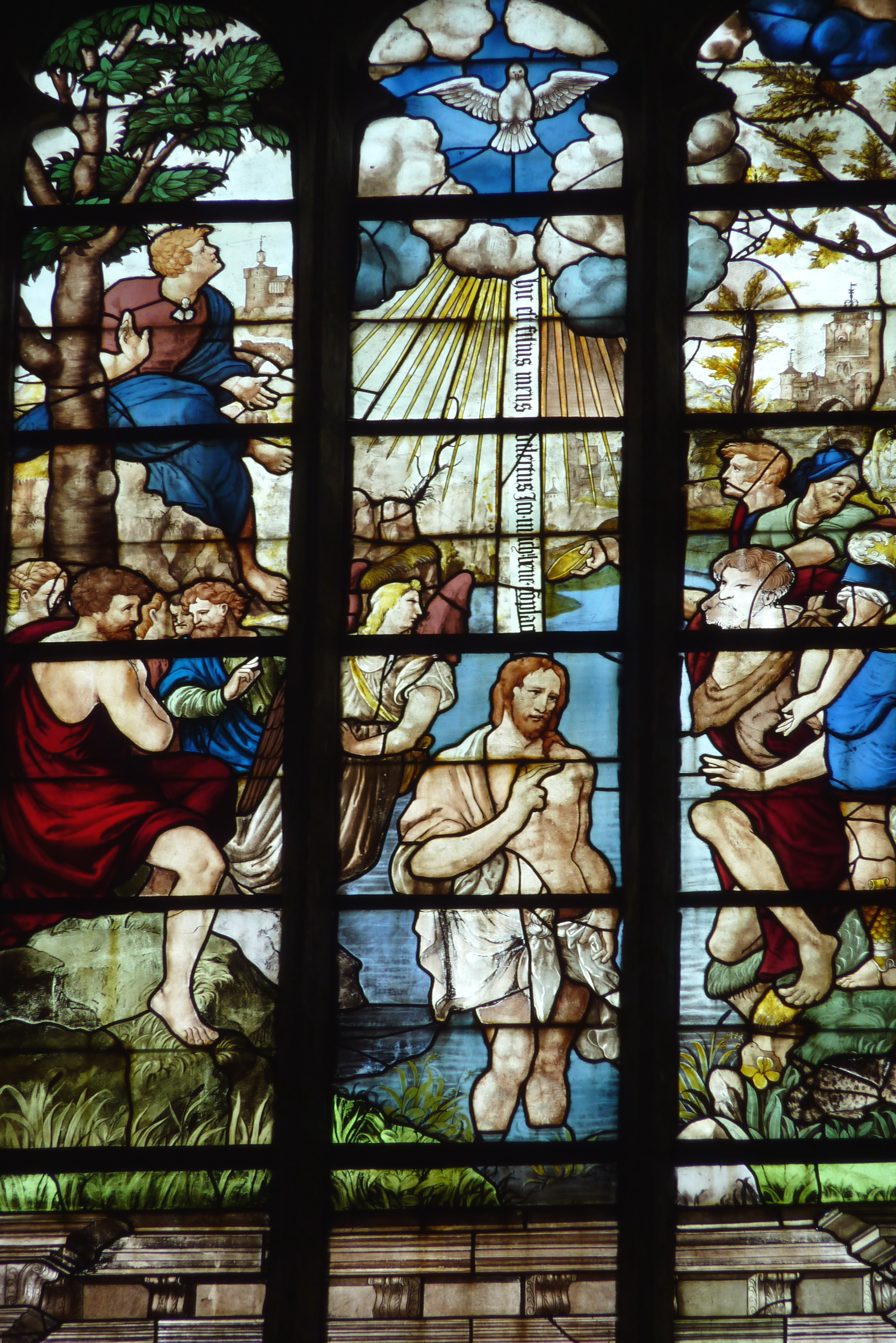
Baptism of Christ in detail

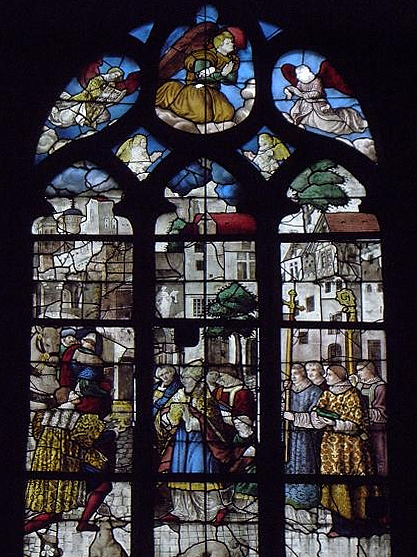
Offering of the relics of Saint John the Baptist

=== Saint-Merry Church ===
Canopies of the life of Saint Peter. A large portion of the church's stained glass windows were dismantled at the request of the fabricators in the 18th century. Prosper Lafaye attempted to restore the scenes between 1847 and 1870, some done rather heavily. Some canopies dating from the origin seem to have been made inspired by Raphael:

- canopy of the Baptism of new believers (bay 110), circa 1540
- canopy of the Arrest of the Apostles (bay 112)
- canopy of the preaching of Saint Peter (bay 114)

=== Church of Saint-Étienne-du-Mont ===
The choir of the Saint-Étienne church was entirely glazed between 1540 and 1542. Jean Chastellain received the order from the Bishop of Avranches, Robert de Sénat, for the stained glass window of the Holy Name of Jesus in bay 101 on August 2, 1540, still in place. He also received the order for the adjacent window on the north side, as well as two stained glass windows for one of the chapels. His death at the end of the year 1541 did not allow him to carry out the stained glass windows of this final order.

He would have made the glass roof of the legend of Saint-Claude (bay 107)

== Notes ==
Just one note from the original creator of this page: this article was translated and smoothed over from its equivalent page on the French Wikipedia, and thus may have a few errors in citations, language, and translation. I can only offer my sincerest apologies for any poor work.

== Bibliography ==
- Jean Lafond, La Cananéenne de Bayonne et le vitrail parisien aux environs de 1530, dans Revue de l'Art, 1970, No. 10, p. 77-84
- Guy-Michel Leproux, Fontainebleau et les arts décoratifs: l'exemple du vitrail, dans Journal des Savants, 1986, No. 1-3, p. 133-154 (lire en ligne)
- Guy-Michel Leproux, Un exemple précoce de l'influence de Raphaël sur l'art français: les vitraux de Jean Chastellain, dans L'Information historique, 1995, No. 3, p. 109-117
- Dany Sandron, Un vitrail de Jean Chastellain pour l'église Saint- Gervais à Paris, dans Bulletin Monumental, 1996, No. 154-4, p. 370 (lire en ligne)
- Guy-Michel Leproux, Conférence Les sources iconographiques de Jean Chastellain: essai de reconstitution du fonds d'atelier d'un peintre verrier parisien de la Renaissance, dans Histoire de Paris - Livret 10 1994-1995, Annuaires de l'École pratique des hautes études Année, 1996, p. 124-125 (lire en ligne)
- Françoise Gratouillat, Guy-Michel Leproux, Élisabeth Pillet, L'église Saint-Merry de Paris: monument daté par ses vitraux, dans Cahiers de la Rotonde, 1997, No. 19, p. 47-114
- Guy-Michel Leproux, Un peintre anversois à Paris sous le règne de François I^{er}, Noël Bellemare, dans Cahiers de la Retonde, 1998, No. 20, p. 125-154
- Guy-Michel Leproux, Jean Chastellain et le vitrail parisien sous le règne de François I^{er}, sous la direction de Guy-Michel Leproux, Vitraux parisiens de la Renaissance, Délégation à l'Action artistique de la Ville de Paris, Paris, 1999, p. 122-145 ISBN 978-2-905118-46-2
- Guy-Michel Leproux, La peinture à Paris sous le règne de François I^{er}, Presses de l'Université Paris-Sorbonne (collection Corpus Vitrearum), Paris, 2001, chapitre II, Gauthier de Campes alias le Maître de Montmorency, alias le Maître des Privilèges de Tournai, alias le Maître de Saint-Gilles, p. 39-110 ISBN 978-2-84050-210-4 (aperçu)
- Sous la direction de Cécile Scailliérez, François I^{er} et l'art des Pays-Bas, Somogy éditions d'art/Musée du Louvre, Paris, 2017, p. 144-145, 155, 169-173, ISBN 978-2-7572-1304-9
