= Saint-Germain l'Auxerrois =

Church in Paris, France

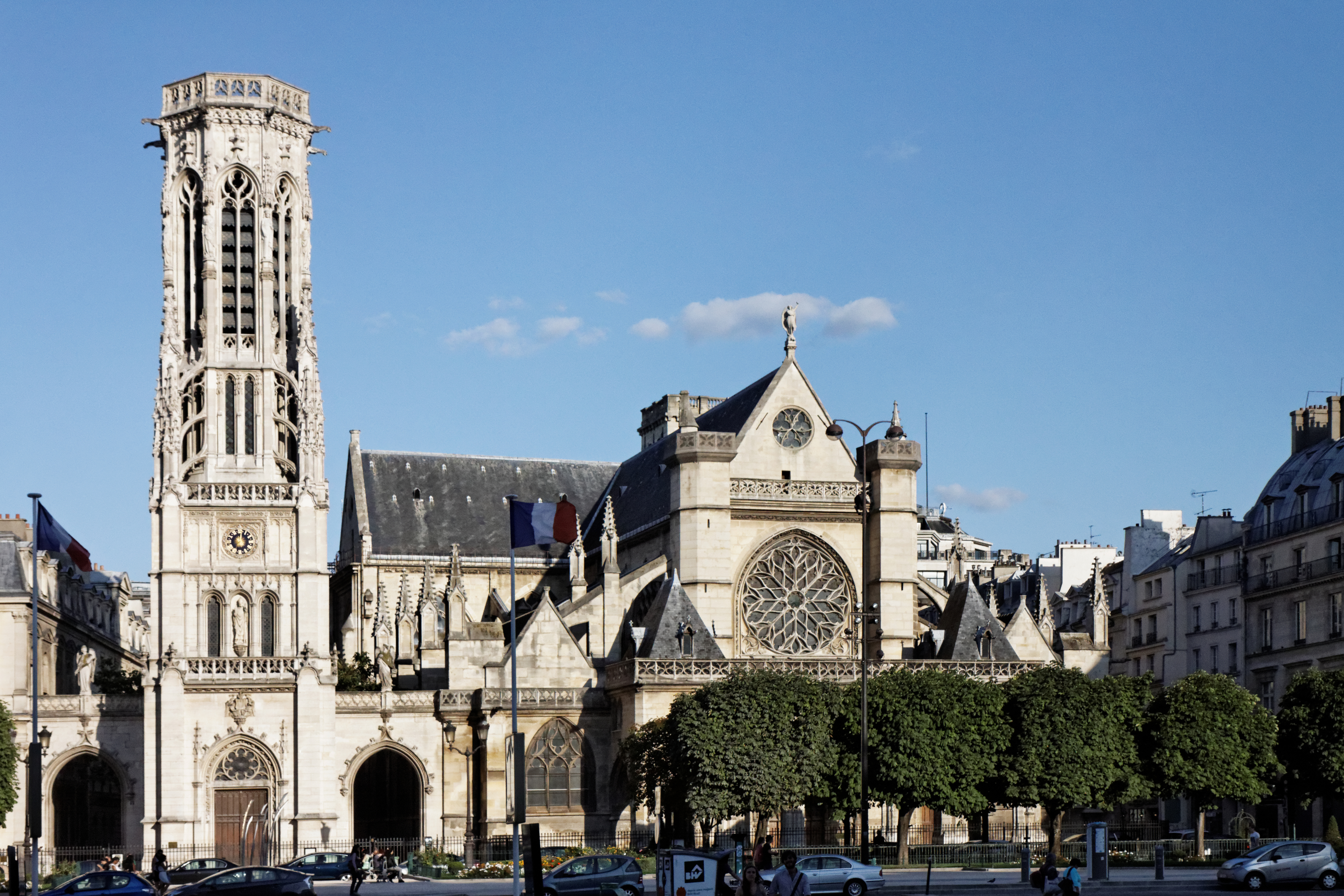
- Saint-Germain l'Auxerrois
- 48°51′34″N 2°20′26″E
- Address: 2 Place du Louvre, 1e, Paris
- Country: France
- Denomination: Catholic Church
- Sui iuris church: Latin Church

Architecture
- Style: French Gothic
- Groundbreaking: 12th century
- Completed: 15th century

Administration
- Archdiocese: Paris

The Church of Saint-Germain l'Auxerrois (French pronunciation: [sɛ̃ ʒɛʁmɛ̃ losɛʁwa]) is a medieval Catholic church in the 1st arrondissement of Paris, directly across from the Louvre Palace. It was named for Saint Germanus of Auxerre, a medieval bishop of Auxerre, who became a papal envoy and met Saint Genevieve, the patron saint of Paris, on his journeys. Genevieve is reputed to have converted Queen Clotilde and her husband, French king Clovis I to Christianity at the tomb of Saint Germain in Auxerre.

The current church was built in the 13th century, with major modifications in the 15th and 16th centuries. From 1608 until 1806, it was the parish church for inhabitants of the Louvre, and the church contains the tombs of many notable artists and architects who worked on the palace. During the reconstruction of Notre-Dame cathedral on the nearby Île de la Cité following the 2019 fire, the cathedral's regular services were moved to Saint-Germain l'Auxerrois.

== History ==
The first place of worship on the site was a small oratory founded in the 5th century to commemorate a meeting of Saint Germanus with Saint Genevieve, the future patron saint of Paris. This structure was replaced by a large church, either by Chilperic I, King of Franks, in about 560, or by Saint Landry of Paris, the bishop of Paris, in about 650. That church was destroyed by the Normans in 886, rebuilt by King Robert II the Pious, and then underwent further construction in the 12th century. The church was, from the Middle Ages, both collegiate and parochial: that is to say that it was partly the seat of a college of canons, and the parish church for all the residents of the district. By the 13th century, it was again considered too small, and was enlarged further. Further changes and additions were made in the 15th and 16th centuries. The current structure is largely from the 15th century,

During the Wars of Religion, its bell, "Marie," was rung on the night of 23 August 1572, which signaled the beginning of the St. Bartholomew's Day Massacre. Thousands of Huguenots, who were visiting Paris for a royal wedding, were killed by the city's mob. The church hosted the funeral of François de Malherbe in 1628, and that of sculptor Antoine Coysevox in 1720.

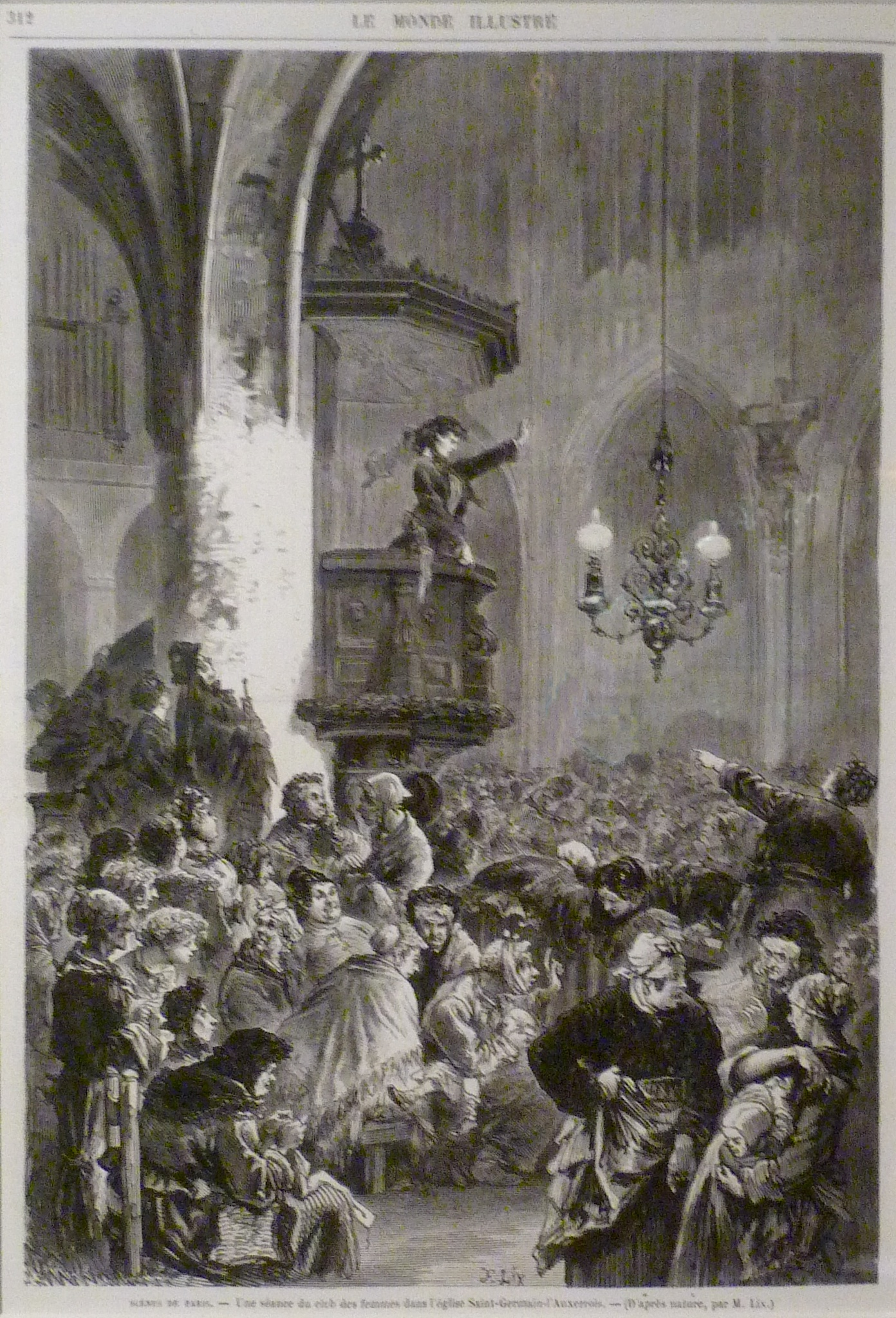
During the Paris Commune in 1871, the church became a socialist women's club.

During the French Revolution, the church was closed, pillaged, and converted into a barn for storing feed for animals, a printing shop, and a gunpowder factory at various times. Some of the original stained glass still remains, despite the revolutionary vandalism. The building was returned to the Catholic Church in 1801, but suffered again during an anticlerical riot in 1831, when many paintings, funeral monuments, and windows were damaged or destroyed. It was closed for several years, then underwent major restoration between 1838 and 1855 under the direction of Jean-Baptiste Lassus and Victor Baltard, who removed some of the surrounding buildings and made the building more visible. Alexandre Boëly was organist at the church from 1840 to 1851.

The church was nearly demolished twice; once under Louis XIV, who envisaged enlarging the Louvre palace and building a new facade in its place; and again under Napoleon III. During Haussmann's renovation of Paris, the church stood in the way of the enlargement of the rue de Rivoli, but Haussmann, a Protestant, refused to destroy it, in part due to the church's historical connection with the St. Bartholemew's Day Massacre.

The church has been the "artists' parish" since the end of the Ancien Régime, when artists were housed in the Louvre. It was here that Jean-Philippe Rameau married on 25 February 1726. The Society of Saint-Jean for the Development of Christian Art, founded in 1839 by Lacordaire, have their masses here and met there every third Friday of the month.

In accordance with the wishes of the artist Adolphe Leon Willette a mass called the "Messe de Willette" has been performed here since 1926 on Ash Wednesday for artists who were going to die during the year. The prayer is normally read by a prominent artist.

After 1 September 2019, following the serious fire at Notre-Dame, the cathedral's services were temporarily transferred to Saint-Germain.

== Exterior ==
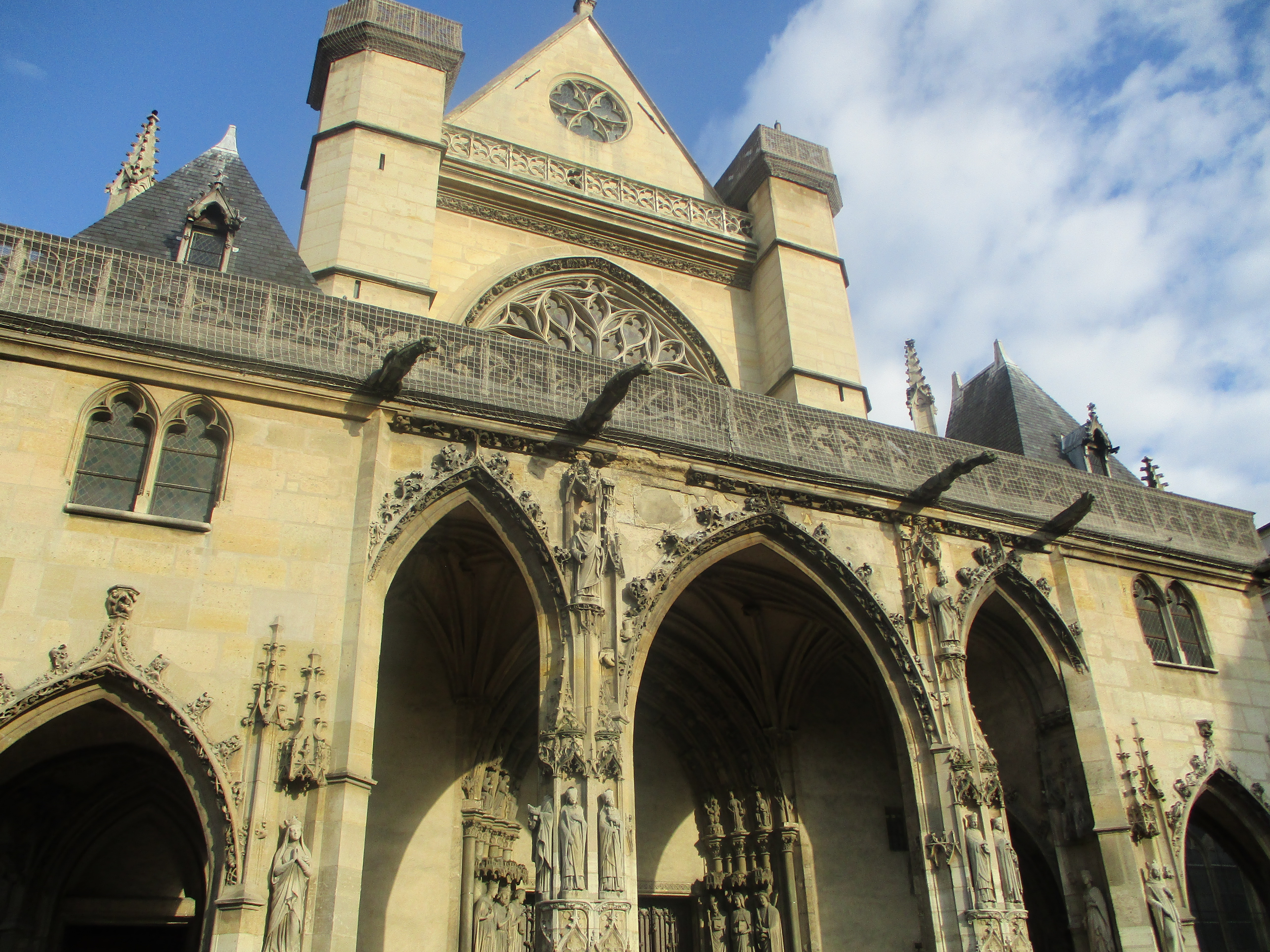
Facade of Saint-Germain

The exterior of the church blends elements of Romanesque, Rayonnant, Flamboyant Gothic, and Renaissance architecture. The only existing Romanesque elements, dating from the 12th century, are found in the lower portion of the bell tower, where it is attached to the south transept. The western portal was built around 1220–1230. It was originally the meeting place of the canons of the cathedral, who held their ecclesiastical court there, and was the classroom where pupils were instructed in the catechism.

Above the rose window is a balustrade which encircles the whole church, a work of Jean Gaussel, dating from 1435–39.

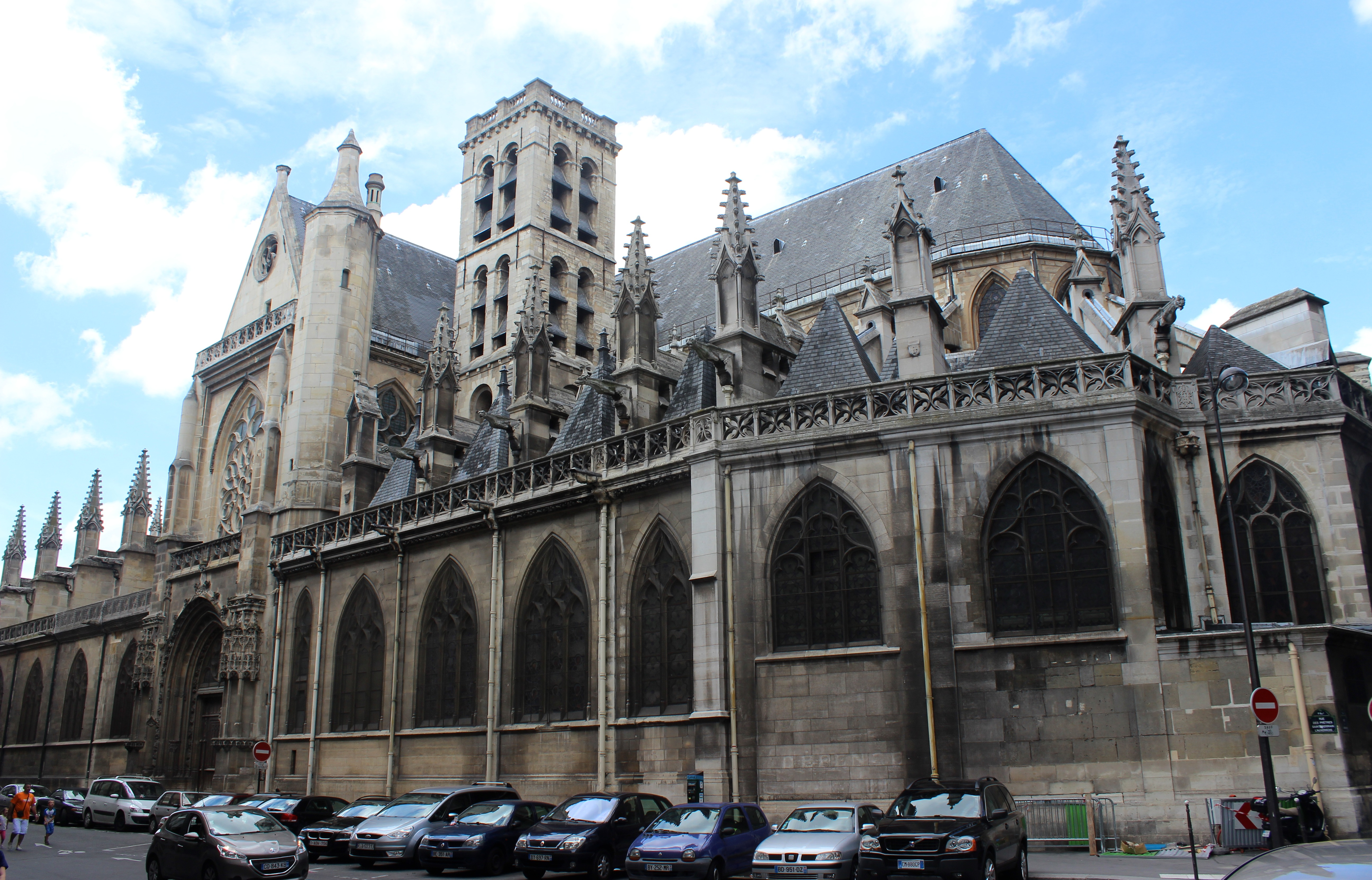
Exterior of the church, viewed from the south

The 19th-century statues on the west facade represent French saints, including Saint Germanus and Saint Clotilde. They are surrounded by a rich assortment of sculpted animals, beggars, and fools.

The arches over the doorway are also crowded with sculpture dating to the end of the 14th century, depicting apostles, angels, the damned and the chosen, sages, and foolish and wise virgins. On the piers of the windows and arches are six reposing statues, resting atop demons and other figures, representing King Childebert I, his wife Queen Ultragotha, and Saint Genevieve, carrying a torch representing the light of Christ. Next to her, an angel relights a torch which a devil has just extinguished. The keys of the vaults also are filled with biblical personages, illustrating the Last Supper and the Adoration of Christ.

The lateral facade is also richly adorned with sculpture, including pinnacles and gargoyles, which also had the practical function of projecting rainwater away from the sides of the building. The consoles of the pinnacles also contain sculpted heads of animals, grimacing monsters, griffons and other fantastic creatures.

The exterior of the church has the only 'Boule aux Rats' (Ball of Rats or Rats Ball) in Paris and is one of four still existing in France. This sculpted stone motif which dates from the 15th and 16th centuries is in the form of a sphere surmounted by a cross. Five rats appear to come out of the ball, which is overseen by a demonic cat. The sculpture is located on top of the central buttress, just under a gargoyle in the courtyard that separates the church from the City-Hall of the 1st arrondissement

=== Bell towers ===
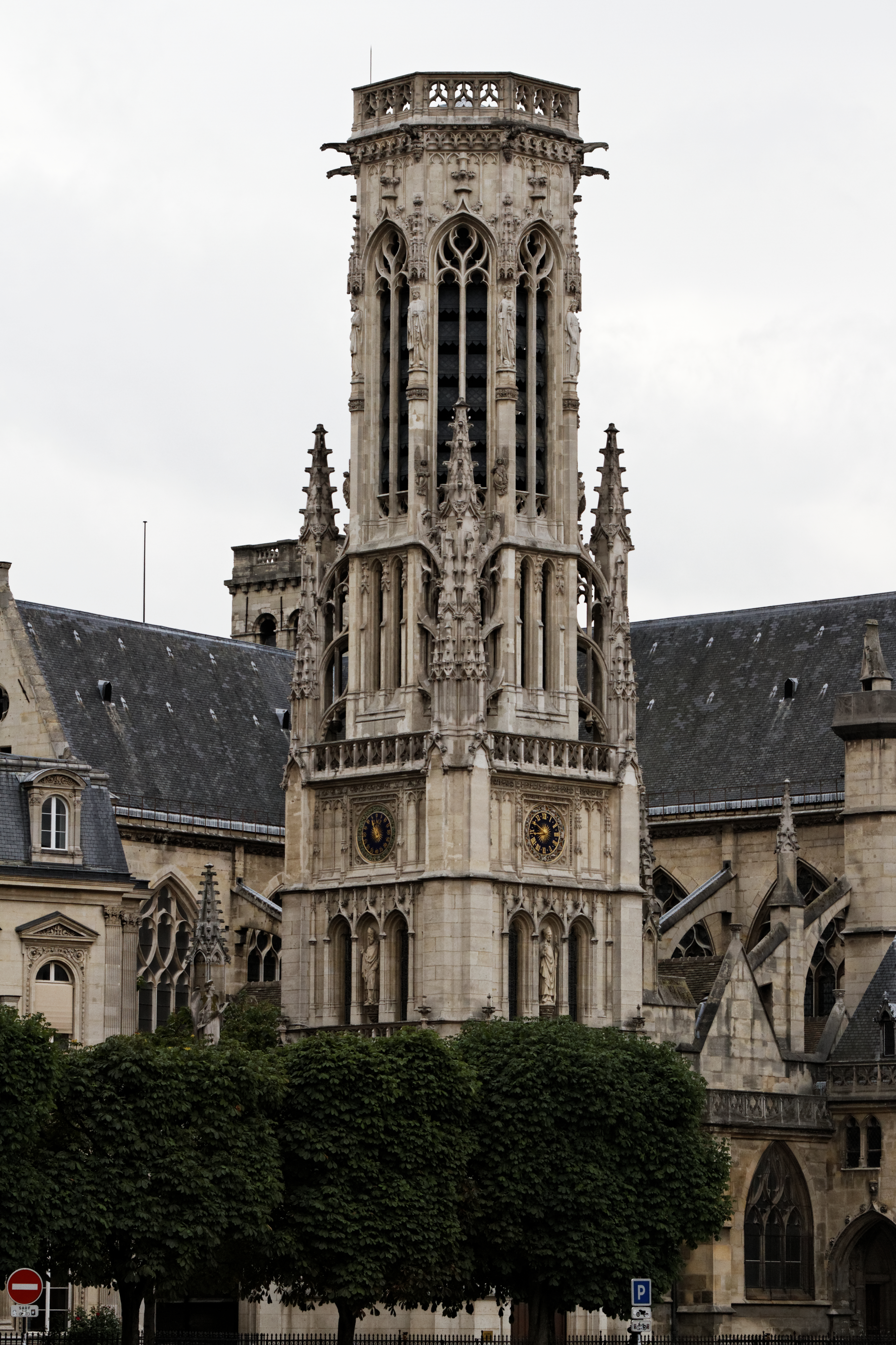
North bell tower

The original bell tower was placed against the south transept of the church in the late 12th century; its lower portions are the only remaining Romanesque elements of the church. This was the bell tower that gave the signal for the beginning of the Saint Bartholomew's Day massacre of Protestants on 23 August 1572.

The north tower was added in about 1860 and is adjacent to the hall of the 1st arrondissement (1859). It was built by architect Théodore Ballu. It was part of the vast reconstruction of central Paris conducted by Baron Haussmann. To maintain harmony, he made the facade of the city hall almost identical in size and form with the facade of the church, complete with a rose window and a porch. He also designed the bell tower between the church and the city hall, in the same Neo-Gothic style. At the same time, Ballu rebuilt the upper portions of the old belfry of the church.

== Interior ==
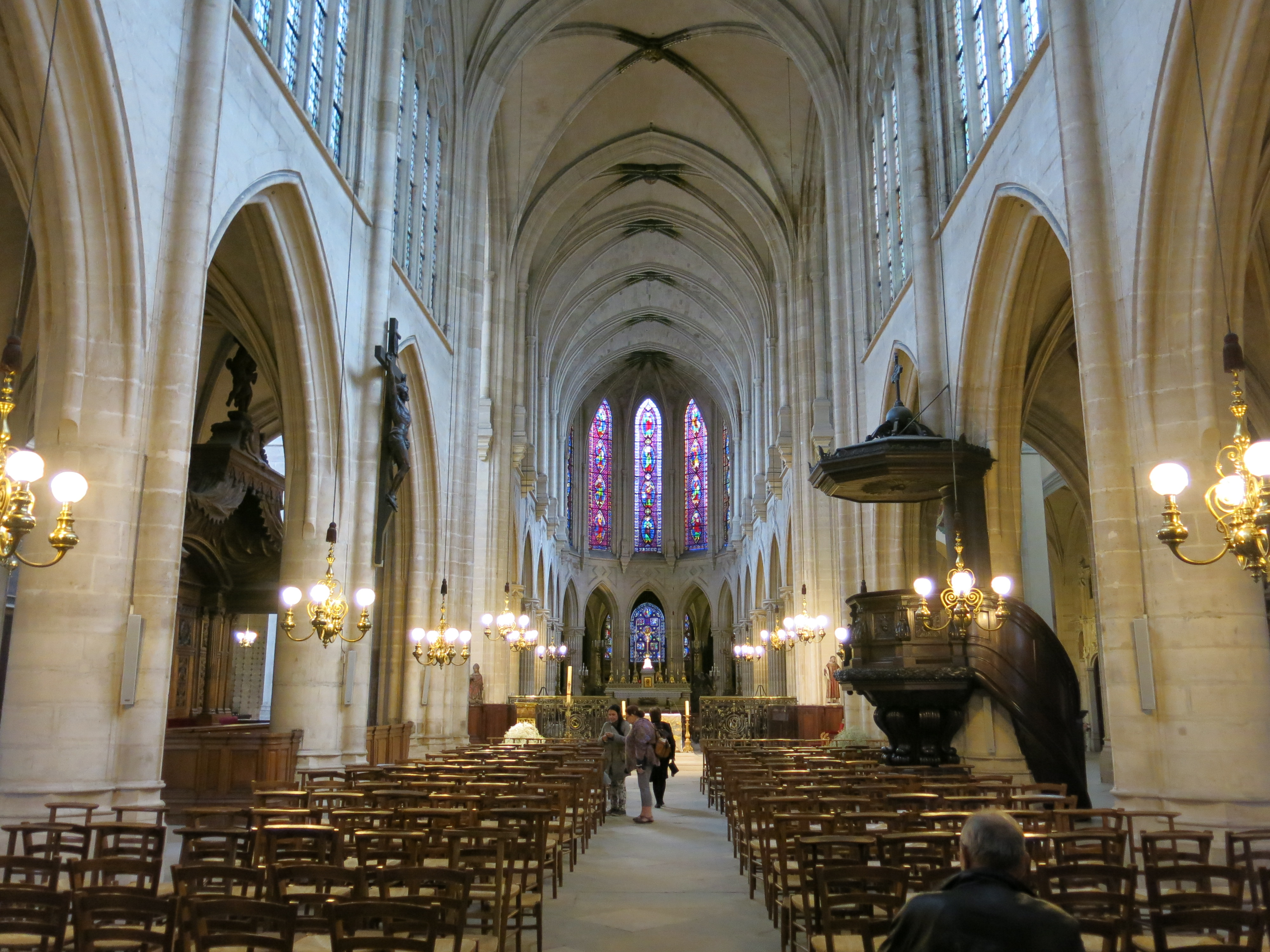
Interior, facing the choir and altar

The church has a long central nave, built in the 15th century, a choir, a transept, and aisles along the nave. Numerous chapels line the aisles, each decorated with paintings and sculptures. Much of the decor comes from the time of Louis XIV, and the interior is lighter and brighter than in Gothic churches. Neoclassical upper windows provide additional light, and are primarily made with clear glass.

The most prominent element of the nave is the monumental set of carved wooden seats, created in 1684 for Louis XIV and the royal family. It is in the center of the church, facing the pulpit. It was made by François Mercier, based on designs by Charles Le Brun.

The south transept contains stained glass windows from both the 16th and 19th century.

The north transept retained most of its original 16th-century stained glass, as well as 19th century windows, but a 2009 fire in the workshop where the windows were being restored destroyed them, and they were replaced by clear glass. The north transept also displays a polychrome wood statue of Saint Germain l'Auxerrois, dating to the 15th century.

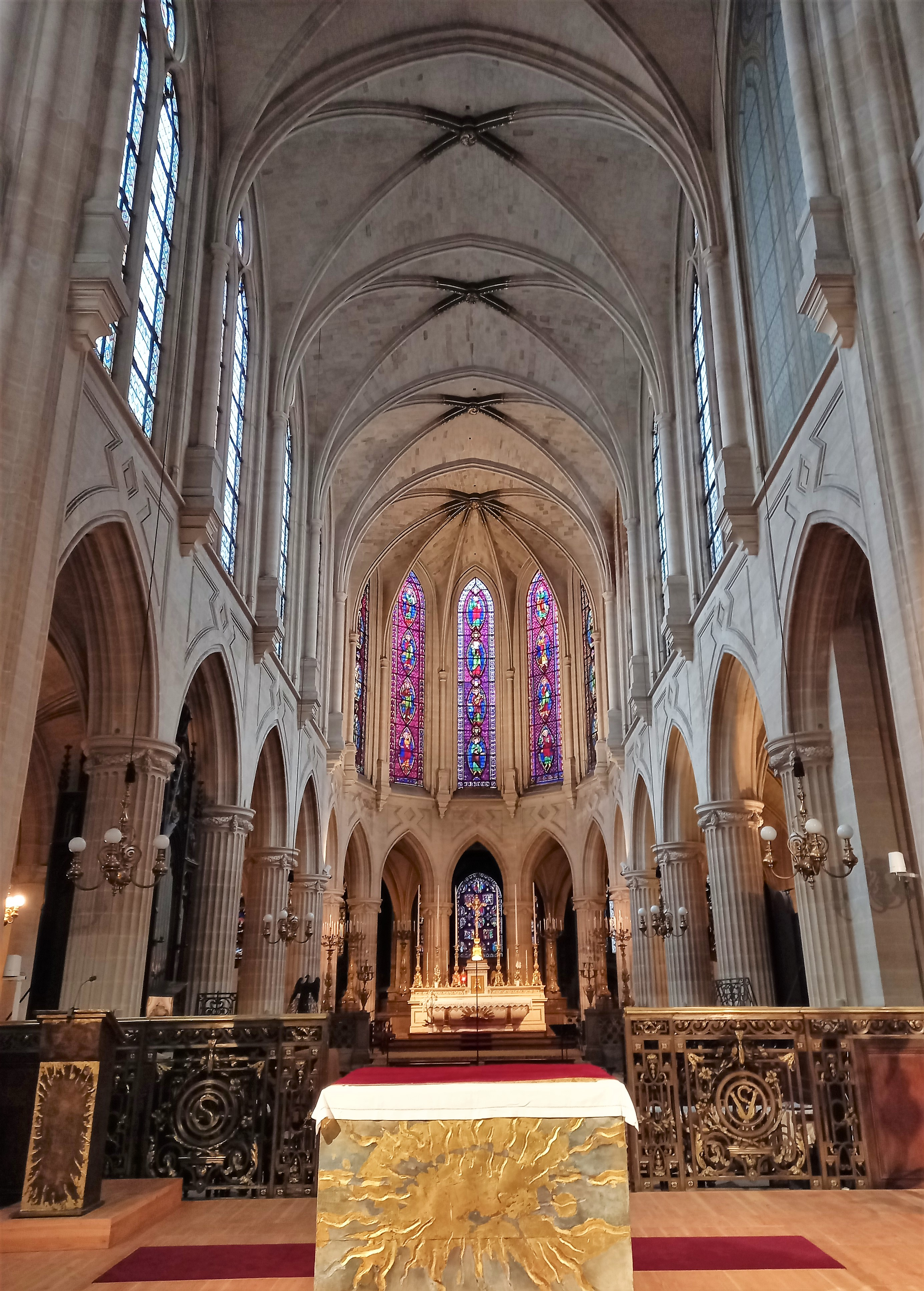
Choir, with the primary altar in the foreground

=== Choir ===
The choir, where the clergy traditionally workshops, is unusual because it is longer than the nave, the seating for lay parishioners. Its Gothic architecture makes it the oldest part of the church interior, though it is overlaid with a considerable amount of Renaissance decoration, particularly the cannelures or vertical grooves of the columns, typical of the classical style.

=== Ambulatory ===
The ambulatory is the passageway that circles the church, enabling parishioners to walk around to the chapels even when a service is going on. It leads to several important chapels and displays several important works of decorative art.

At the entrance to the sacristy is a major work of the 17th century painter Sebastien Bourdon (1616–1671), "Saint Pierre Nolasque receives the habit of the Order of Notre Dame of Mercy." It is an example of the enormous and complex altar paintings for which he was known. Painted at the height of his career, it displays his particular skill at blending architecture and crowds of figures in rising levels.

Another notable work in the ambulatory is the triptych depicting the history of the original sin and the Legend of the Virgin Mary. It was made of carved and painted wood in Flanders between 1510 and 1530. It portrays (right) God the Father offering the fruits of the tree of life to Adam and Eve; (left) Satan extends the forbidden fruit to Eve; and (center), scenes form the life of the Virgin Mary. It was confiscated from the Church during the Revolution and returned afterwards, with two panels missing.

=== Chapels ===
==== Chapel of the Virgin ====
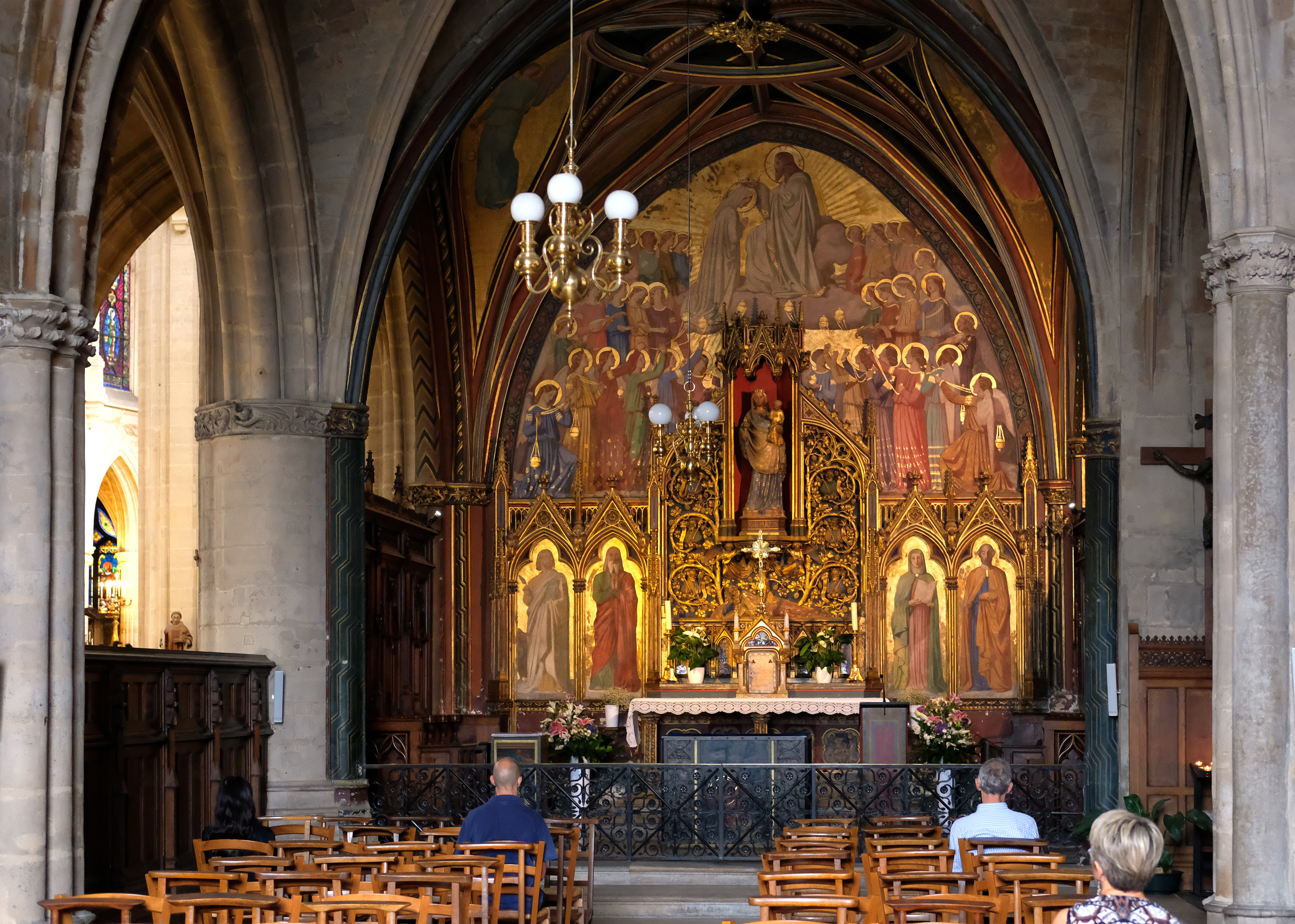
Chapel of the Virgin Mary

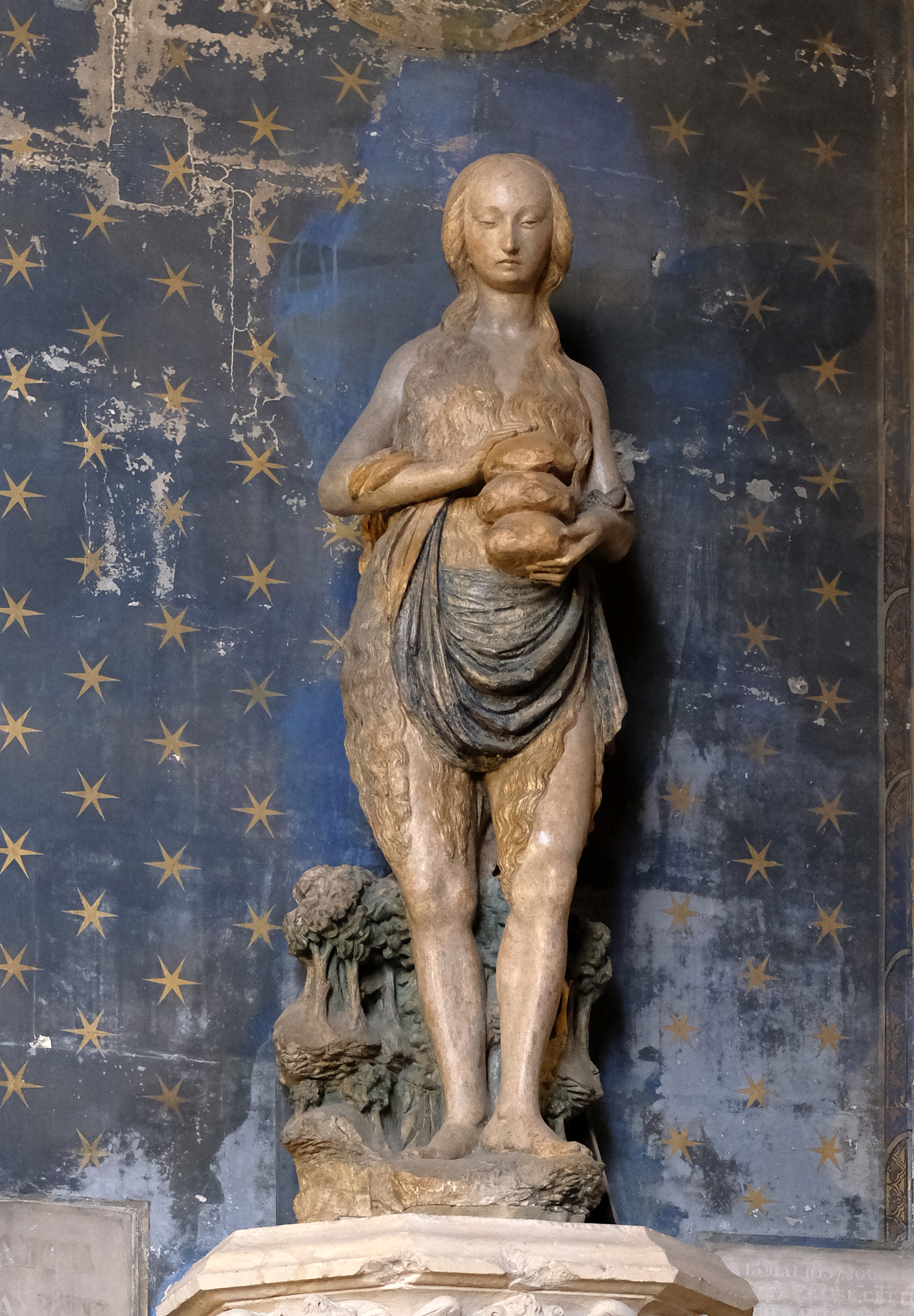
Mary of Egypt.

The Chapel of the Virgin, usually located in the east end of a cathedral, is found near the entrance of the church on the south collateral aisle. The choir and the first bay of the chapel date from the 14th century. It was created by combining four earlier chapels, then restored in the 19th century. It was originally used exclusively by the cannons of the cathedral chapter, but in the 15th century the cannons moved to the choir and the chapel was opened to the entire congregation.

The chapel is decorated with very elaborate sculpture combined with a group of paintings by the 19th century artist Eugene Amaury-Duval (1808–1885), such as the fresco painting "The Crowning of the Virgin". His works were created in a style close to that of the Pre-Raphaelite movement and the 14th century, especially the work of Fra Angelico, with a great simplicity of composition and elegance. Amaury-Duval's paintings are distinguished from the Pre-Raphaelites by their more sculptural figures.

The oldest work on display in the chapel is a statue of the patron saint of the church, Saint Germain of Auxerre, dating from the 13th century. Nearby is a statue of Saint Mary of Egypt, from the end of the 15th or beginning of the 16th century. The figure depicts her clothed only with her long hair, and holding three loaves of bread, which, according to her legend, allowed her to live for sixty years in the Egyptian desert.

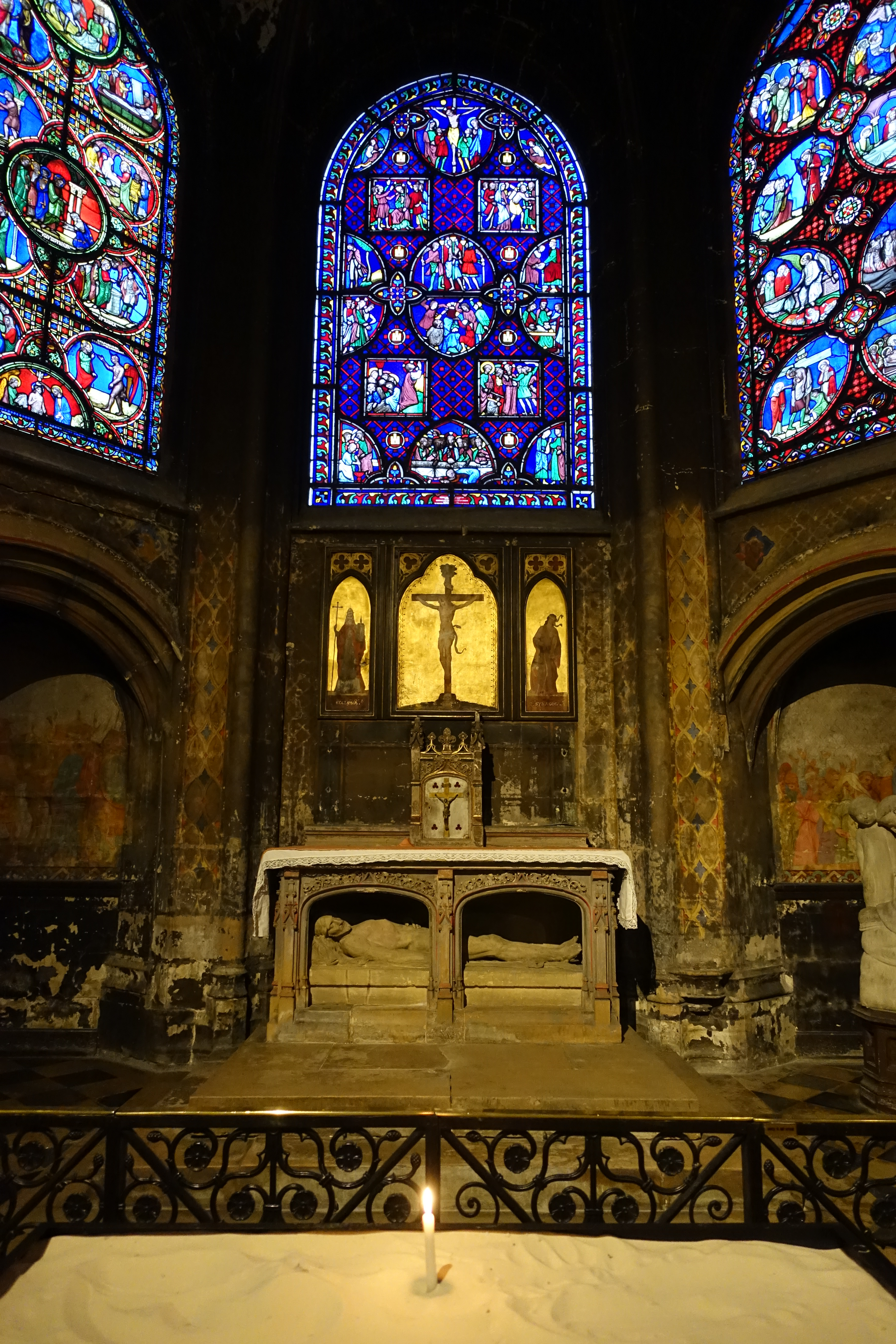
Chapel of the Tomb

==== Chapel of the Tomb ====
The Chapel of the Tomb (or Chapel of Calvary) is one of the oldest in the church. It was created in 1505 by a merchant of drapery named Tronson. He also donated money for ornament of the exterior, sculpture slices of fish, or "Trocons", a pun on his name. It became the chapel of the Guild of Drapers, which held special masses and events in the chapel. During the 1831 riots, the chapel was badly damaged, the tombs pillaged and the stained glass smashed. It was restored in the neo-Gothic style beginning in 1840, with new stained glass by Etienne Thevenot (1840), modelled after the windows of the Sainte-Chapelle in Paris, with scenes depicting the life of Christ. The altar dates to the 1840, and is in the Louis XIV style, carved of the stone of Conflans. The statue of Christ below the altar in the chapel is of uncertain origin, likely from the 16th century.

==== Chapel of Saint Landry of Paris ====
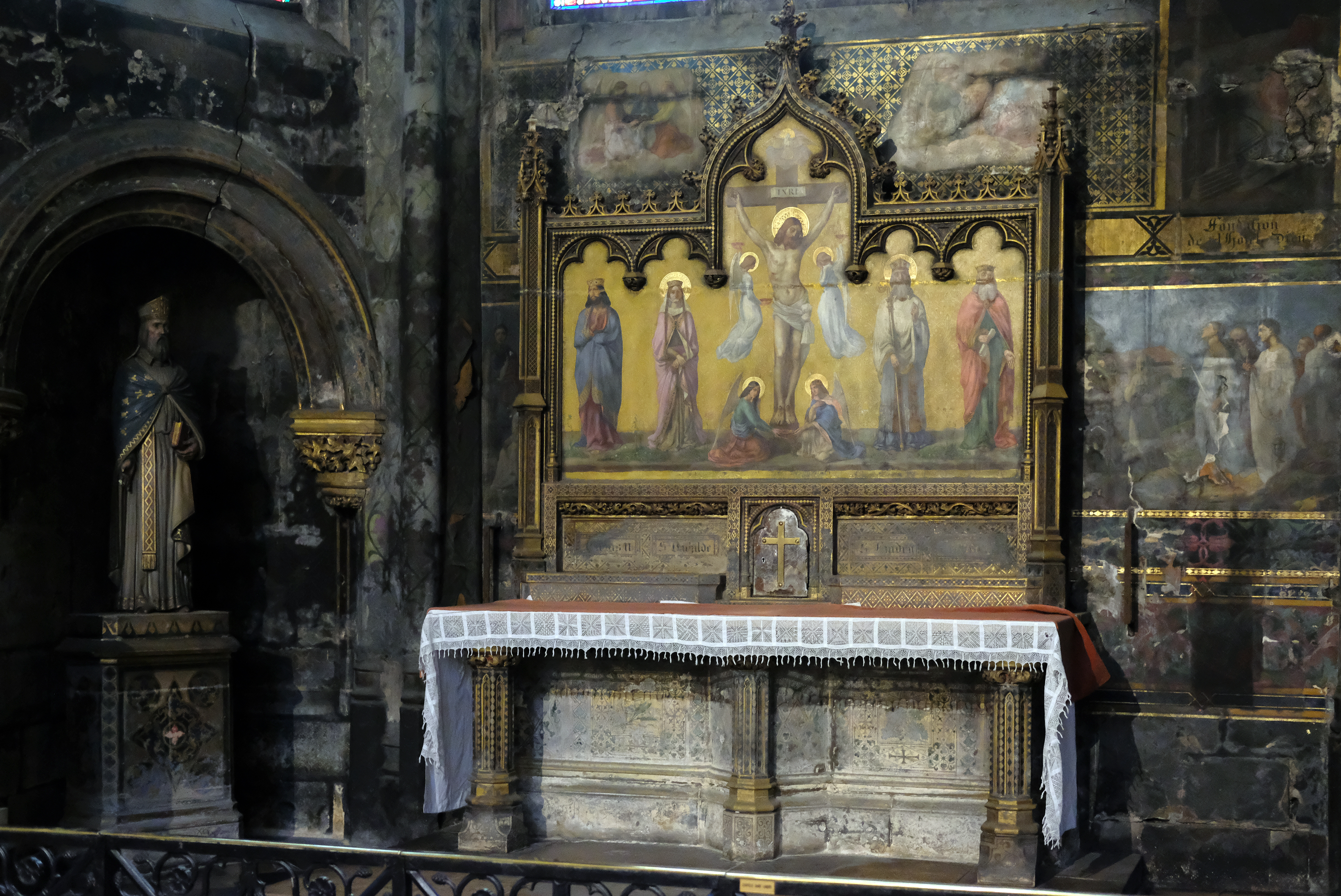
Chapel of Saint Landry

The Chapel of Saint Landry dates from the 19th century, but it was originally built between 1521 and 1522, and was originally devoted to Saint Peter and Saint Paul. It became a family tomb for Etienne d'Alegre in 1624. It 1817, Louis XVIII took it as the repository of the heart of Joseph Hyacinthe François de Paule de Rigaud, Comte de Vaudreuil. The rest of Rigaud's corpse remained in the family plot of the Calvaire cemetery in Paris. Later in the 19th century, after the overthrow of Louis XVIII, it was rededicated to Saint Landry of Paris, who died in 661. Landry was the bishop of Paris in the 7th century who founded the Hôtel-Dieu, Paris, the oldest Paris hospital and considered the oldest hospital in the world still in operation.

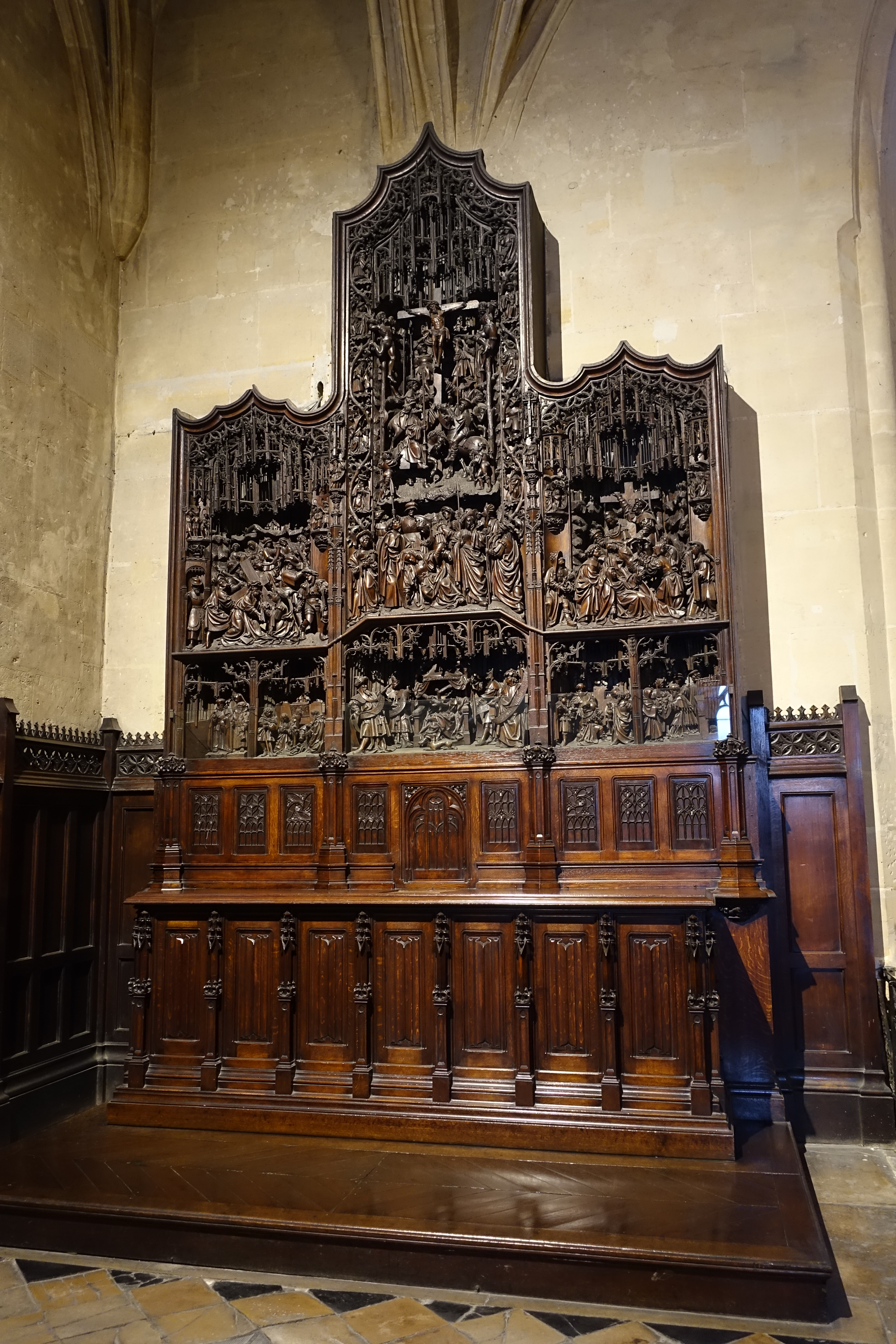
Flemish retable

==== Chapel of Compassion ====
The Chapel of the Compassion, accessed from the ambulatory, was the former royal chapel. It contains one of the most notable works of art in the church, a Flemish carved retable made in about 1515 in Antwerp, near the end of the Middle Ages, when Flanders was at its artistic height. The carved sculpture represents scenes from the Old and New Testament, and figures from all ranks of society, from kings and nobles to soldiers and peasants in traditional Flemish costume. The central compartment depicts a Tree of Jesse, illustrating the genealogy of Christ.

=== Organ ===
Nothing remains of the original organ of Saint-Germain l'Auxerrois, built before the Revolution. Some accounts say that the present organ was transferred from Sainte-Chapelle in July 1791, where it had been built twenty years earlier by François-Henri Clicquot, with a case designed by Pierre-Noël Rousset in 1752. However, its Neoclassical style seems to some writers to be too modern for that date.

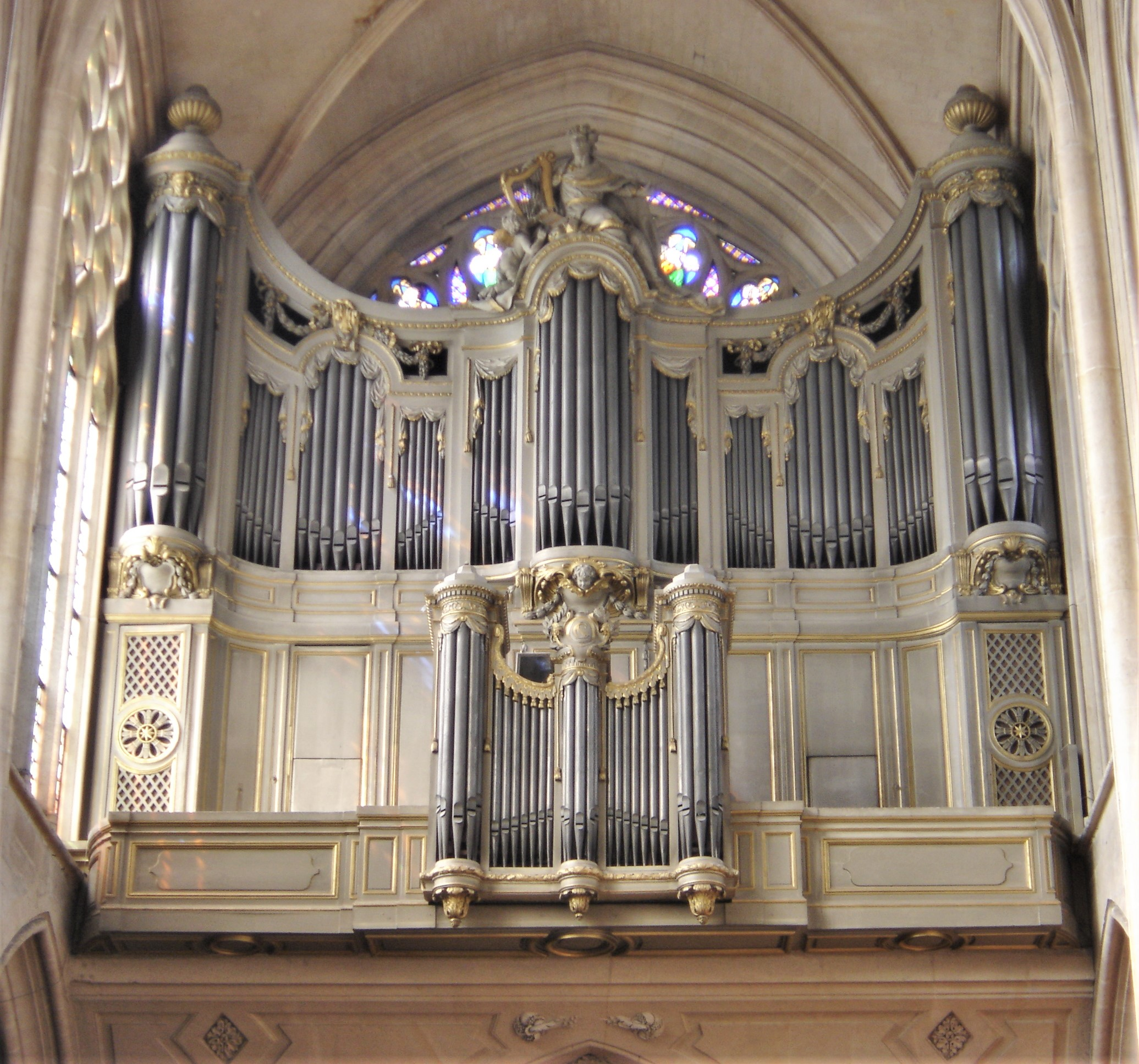
Great organ

From 1838 to 1841, Following the destruction in the church interior in the 1835 riot, the organ underwent a major restoration by Louis-Paul Dallery. Among the modifications made by Dallery, at the request of the new organist, Alexandre Boëly, was the addition of additional keys and pedals to enable the organist to fully play the works of Johann Sebastian Bach. The instrument underwent further major modifications between 1847 and 1850, 1864, and in 1970–1980. The last modification were made with the intent of recapturing the original sound of the first organ by Cliquot in the 18th century. This was not a success, and some parts of the instrument gradually became unplayable.

A new restoration was undertaken beginning in 2008, which undertook to clean out the dust, and to preserve as much as possible of the original mechanism. Some of the old pipes and effects of the Cliquot organ which had become unplayable were cleaned and returned to service, and other pipes modified and reharmonized, to recapture, as much as possible the original sound.

The smaller choir organ, in the center of the church, was built in 1838 by John Abbey, enlarged in 1900 by Joseph Merklin, and reharmonized in 1980 by Adrien Maciet.

== Stained glass ==
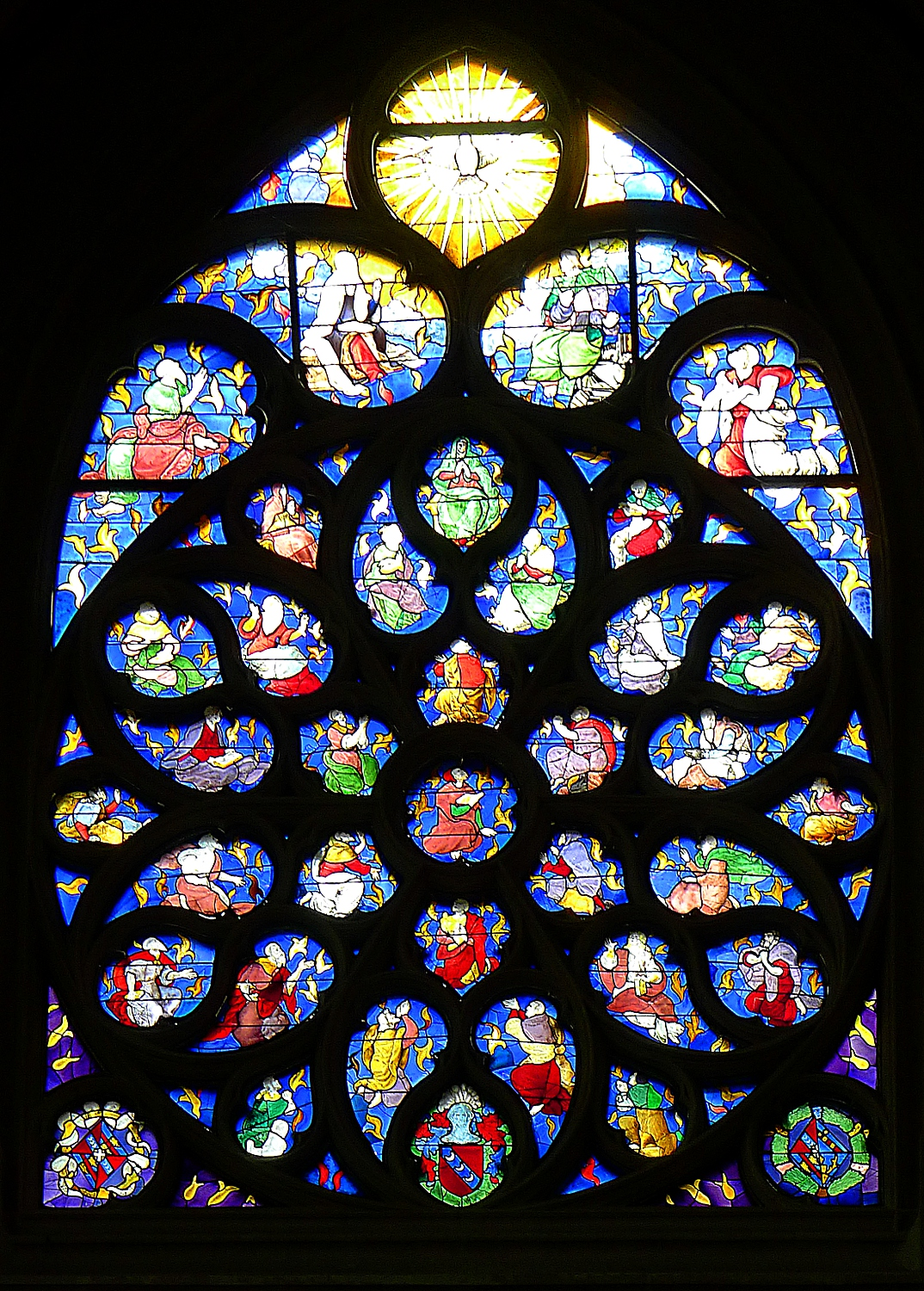
The rose window, made by Jean Chastellain

Most of the medieval and Renaissance stained glass was destroyed in the sacking of the church in 1831, but some notable examples remain. These include the rose window in the south transept, with scenes of the Pentecost designed by Jean Chastellain, with the Holy Spirit taking the form of a dove, and the window depicting the Incredulity of Saint Thomas, with glass by Jean Chastellain from a drawing by Noël Bellemare (1533).

Most of the medieval and Renaissance stained glass was destroyed during the Revolution and in the 1831 riots, but a few notable examples can still be found in the side chapels.

The largest part of the glass in the church dates to the mid-19th century. The Chapel of the Virgin contains examples of work of this period, by Charles-Laurent Maréchal and Louis-Napoléon Gugnon, and Etienne Thenvenot.

Antoine Lusson, who worked in collaboration with Eugene Viollet-le-Duc, also created Neo-Gothic glass for the church.

== Notable tombs ==
The church contains a number of tombs of prominent artists who contributed to the decoration of the neighbouring Louvre during the 17th and 18th century. They include François de Malherbe (1628), Antoine Coysevox (1720), François Boucher (1770), and Jean-Baptiste-Siméon Chardin (1779).

== See also ==
- List of historic churches in Paris
