= Tour Saint-Jacques =

Monument located in Paris, France

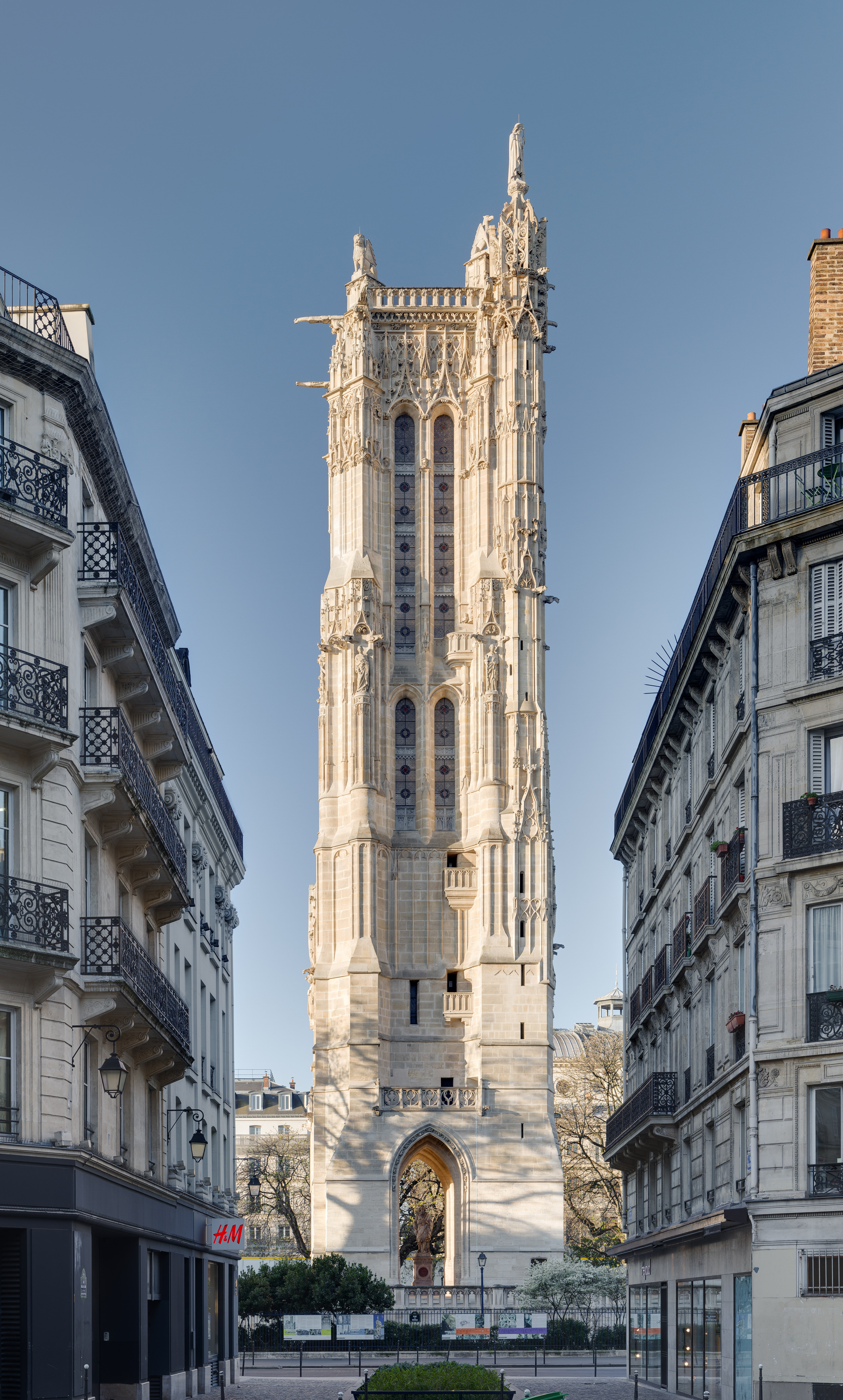
- Tour Saint-Jacques in April 2015
- Interactive map of Tour Saint-Jacques
- Location: 4th arrondissement of Paris
- Coordinates: 48°51′28.7″N 2°20′56.1″E
- Type: Church ruins
- Height: 52 metres (171 ft)
- Beginning date: 1509
- Completion date: 1523
- Dedicated to: St James the Great

UNESCO World Heritage Site
- Criteria: Cultural: ii, iv, vi
- Designated: 1998 (22nd session)
- Part of: Routes of Santiago de Compostela in France
- Reference no.: 868-031
- Region: Europe and North America

Monument historique
- Designated: 1862
- Reference no.: PA00086479

Tour Saint-Jacques (French: [tuʁ sɛ̃ʒak], 'Saint James's Tower') is a monument located in the 4th arrondissement of Paris, France, on the Rive Droite. This 52-metre (171 ft) Flamboyant Gothic tower at the intersection of the Rue de Rivoli with Rue Nicolas-Flamel is all that remains of the former medieval Church of Saint-Jacques-de-la-Boucherie ('Saint James of the Meat Market'), which was partially rebuilt in the 16th-century and demolished in 1797, during the French Revolution, leaving only the tower. The stones of the old church were treated as if it were a quarry.

What remains of the destroyed church of Saint-Jacques-de-la-Boucherie is now considered a national historic landmark.

== History ==
=== The Way of St James ===
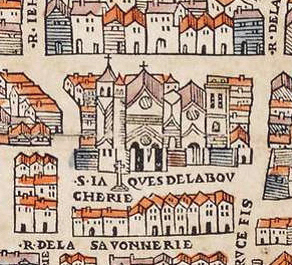
Saint-Jacques-de-la-Boucherie church on the map of Truschet and Hoyau (1550)

The tower's rich decoration reflects the wealth of its patrons, the wholesale butchers of the nearby Les Halles market. The masons in charge were Jean de Felin, Julien Ménart and Jean de Revier. It was built in 1509 to 1523, during the reign of King Francis I. With a dedication to Saint James the Greater, the ancient church and its landmark tower welcomed pilgrims setting out on the road that led to Tours and headed for the Way of St James, which led to the major pilgrimage destination of Santiago de Compostela. A relic of the saint preserved in the church linked it the more strongly and in modern times occasioned its listing in 1998 as a World Heritage Site by UNESCO among the sites and structures marking the chemins de Compostelle, the pilgrimage routes in France that led like tributaries of a great stream headed towards Santiago in the northwest of Spain.

=== 19th century ===
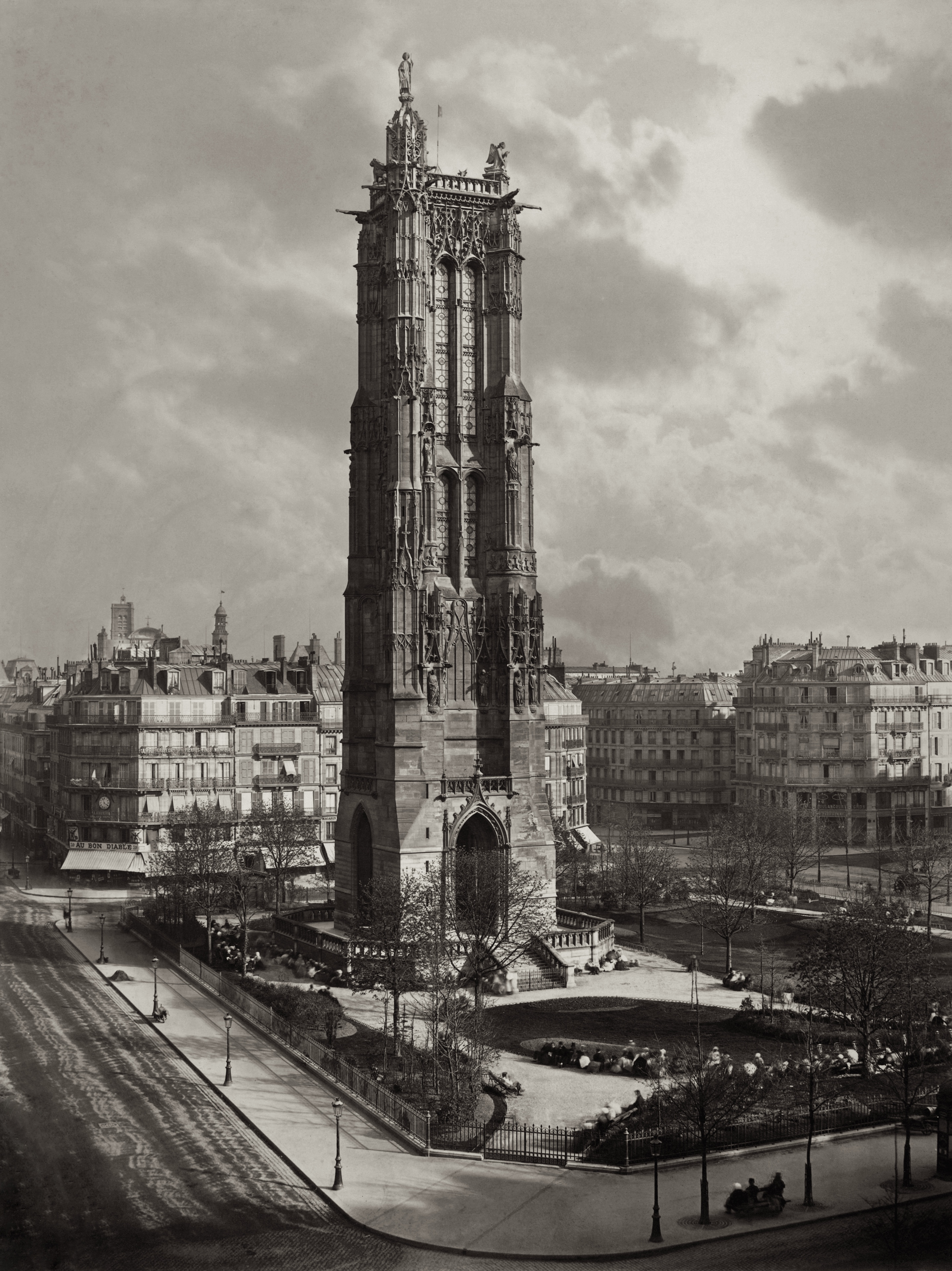
Tour Saint-Jacques c. 1867

The church, with the exception of the tower, was demolished in 1793; preservation of the tower was a condition of the contract by which the church was bought for the value of its building materials. In 1824 it was being used as a shot tower to make small shot. It was repurchased by the City of Paris in 1836 and declared a monument historique in 1862. A statue of the saint was installed on the top of the tower during the 19th century.

During the Second Empire, the architect Théodore Ballu restored the tower, placing it on a pedestal and designing a small city park around it. This coincided with the construction of the Rue de Rivoli and Avenue Victoria nearby, requiring huge quantities of earth to be removed to ensure the Rue de Rivoli a smooth flat path. The pedestal allowed the tower to retain its original elevation: nowadays, the change in ground level can best be appreciated in Rue Saint-Bon, just northeast of the tower, where a staircase leads up to the original street level at the Rue de la Verrerie.

A statue of Blaise Pascal is located at the base of the tower, commemorating the experiments on atmospheric pressure, though it is debated whether they were performed here or at the church of Saint-Jacques-du-Haut-Pas. A meteorological laboratory is also installed at the top of the tower.

The tower inspired Alexandre Dumas to write the play La tour Saint-Jacques-de-la-boucherie in 1856.

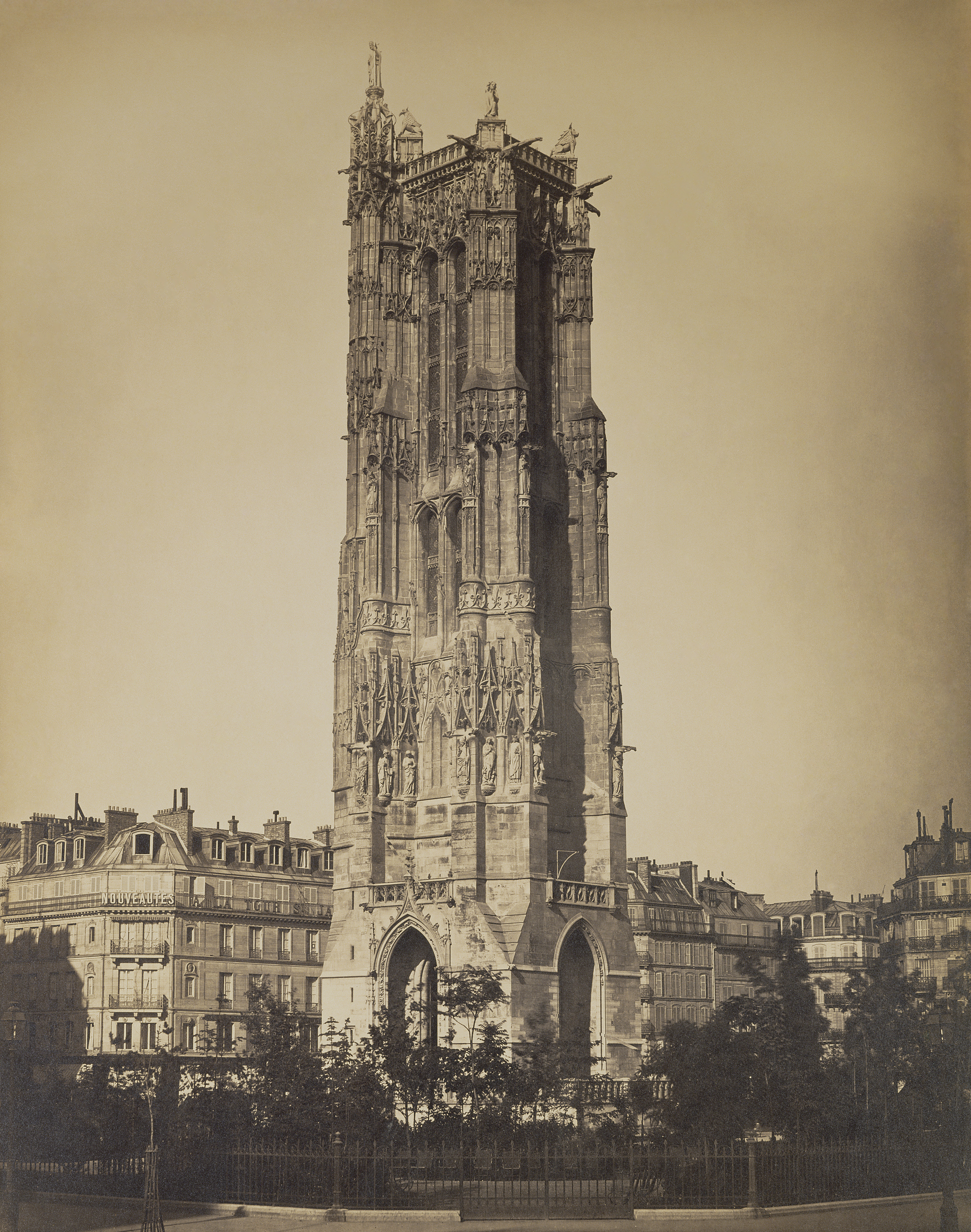
Albumen print by Gustave Le Gray, 1859

Nicolas Flamel, reputedly an alchemist and a patron of the church, was buried under its floor.

=== Modern restoration ===
The tower was surrounded by scaffolding and obscured by sheeting for some years as surveyors investigated the condition of the stone. Recent findings show that most of the stone and its ornamentation originates from the late-medieval era of the tower's construction, and was not added by the 19th-century restorers. Unfortunately, the survey also indicates serious cracking. The top three quarters of sheeting were taken down in March 2008, revealing a renovated upper section of the tower. From October 2008 to February 2009, the scaffolds and sheeting were completely removed and the surrounding park's landscaping was being restored. Finally, on 18 April 2009, the park was re-opened to the public.

== Gallery ==
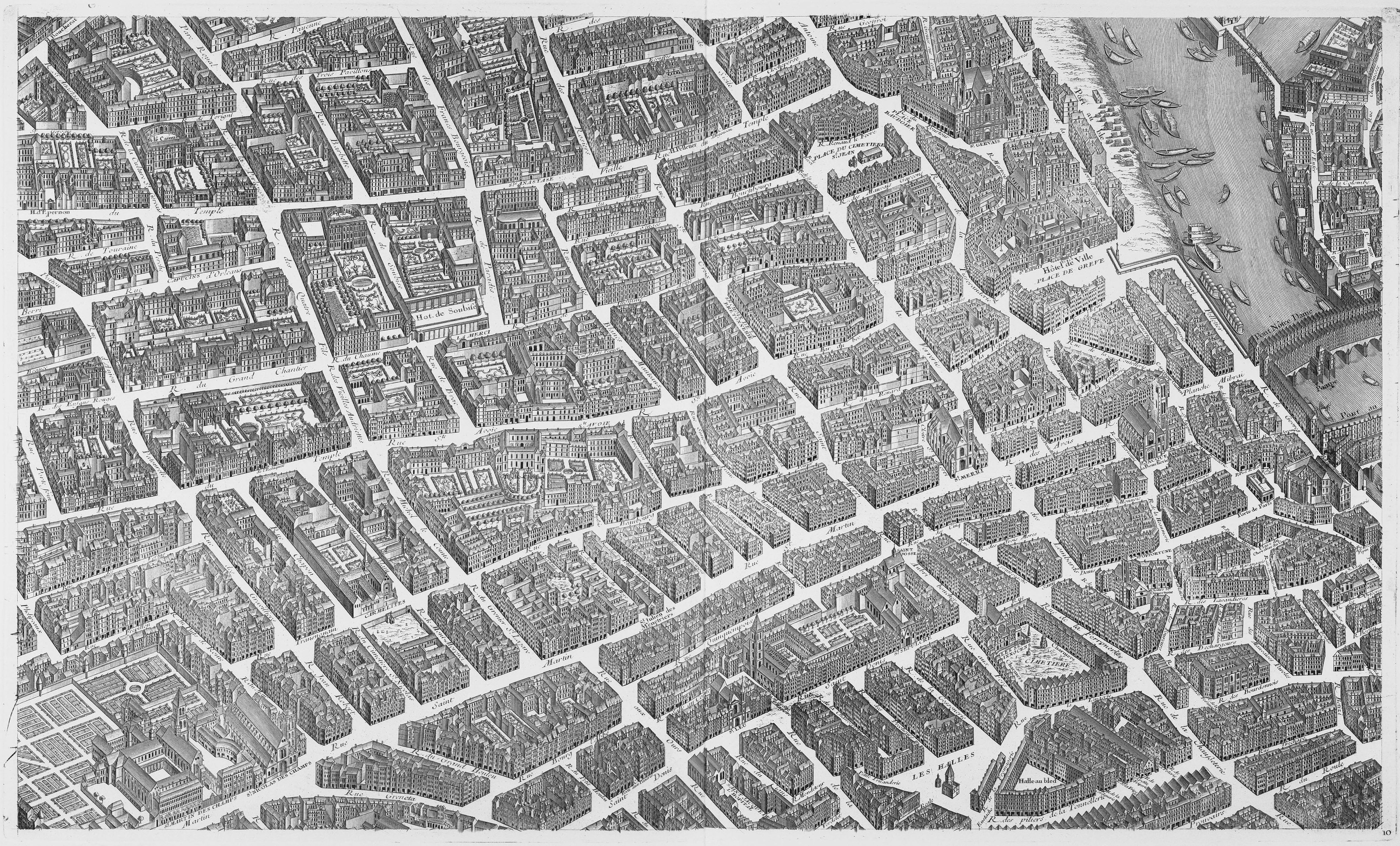
Saint-Jacques-de-la-Boucherie and its surroundings on the Turgot map of Paris (1736)

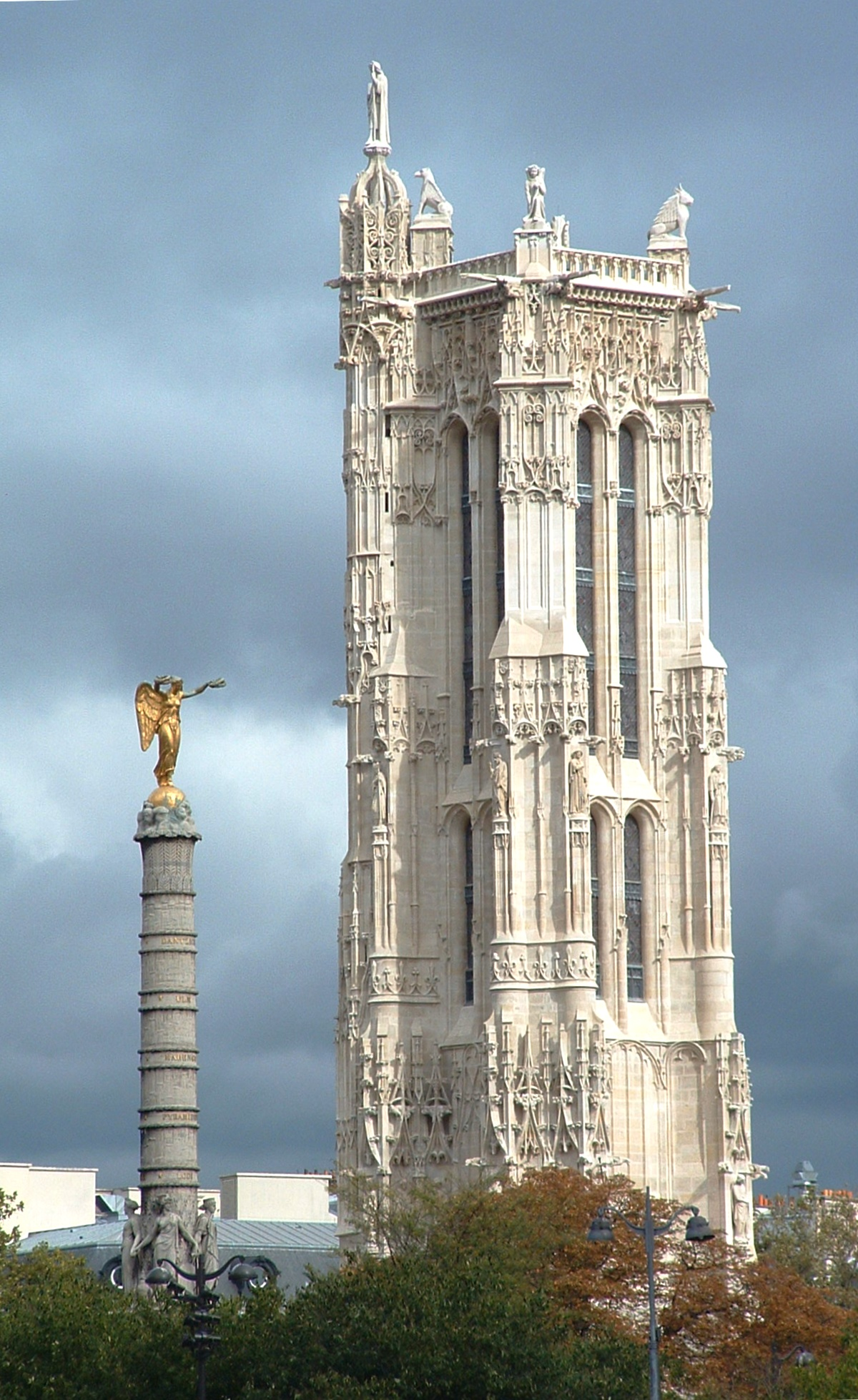
Saint-Jacques Tower as seen from the Conciergerie, with the "Victory Column" of Place du Châtelet in 2008

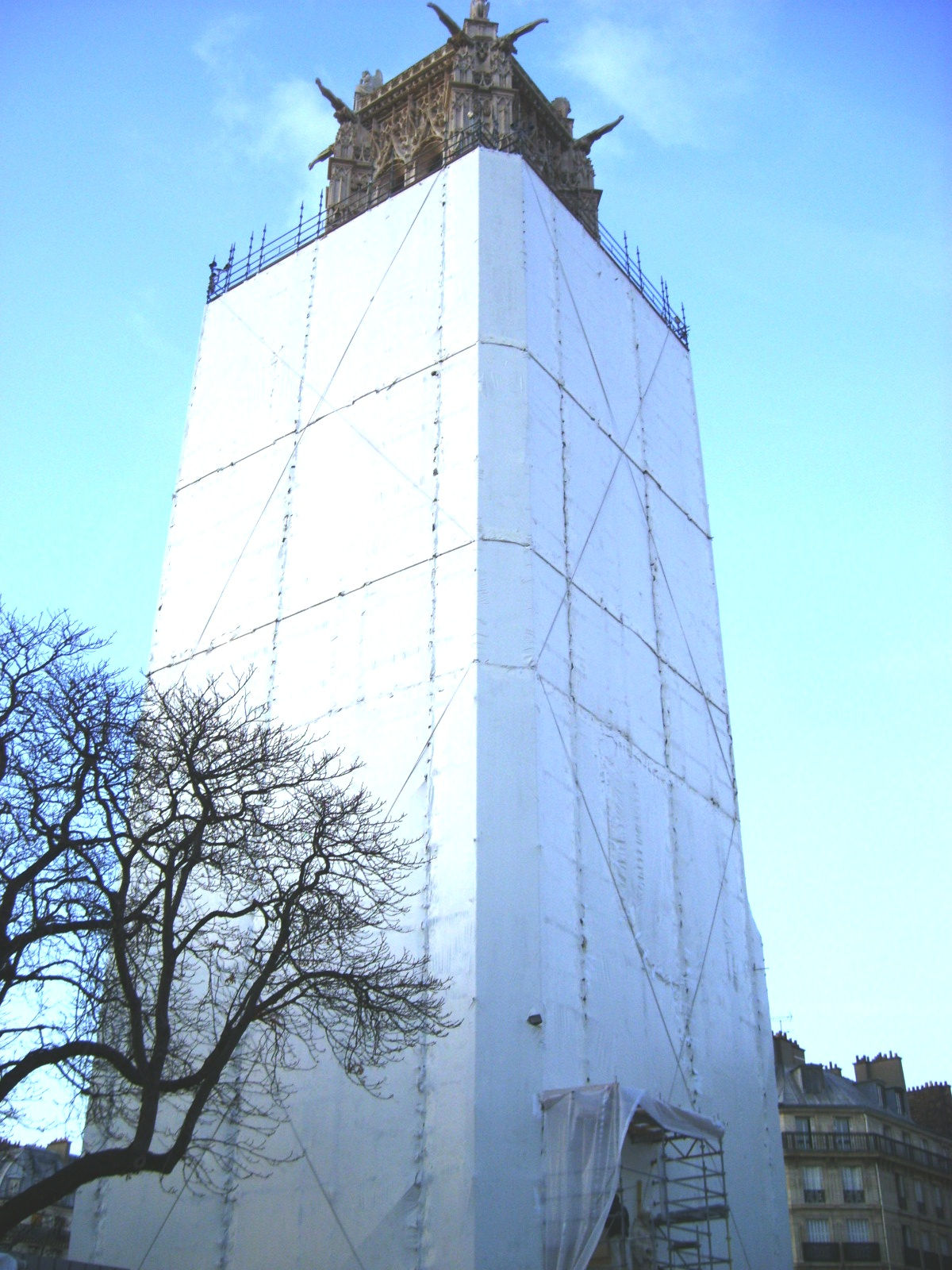
Restoration of the Saint-Jacques Tower in November 2007

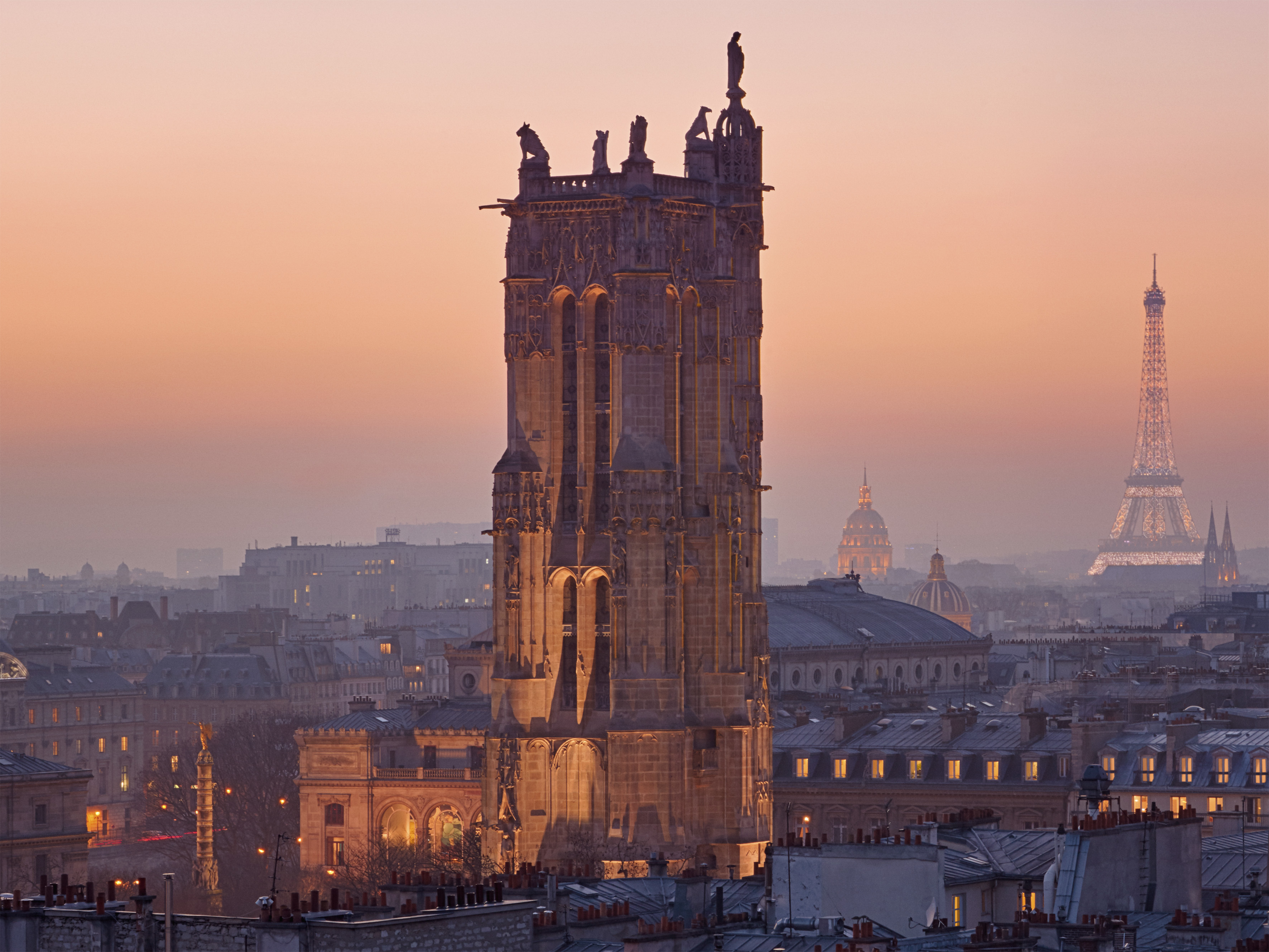
Saint-Jacques tower at dusk, 2015

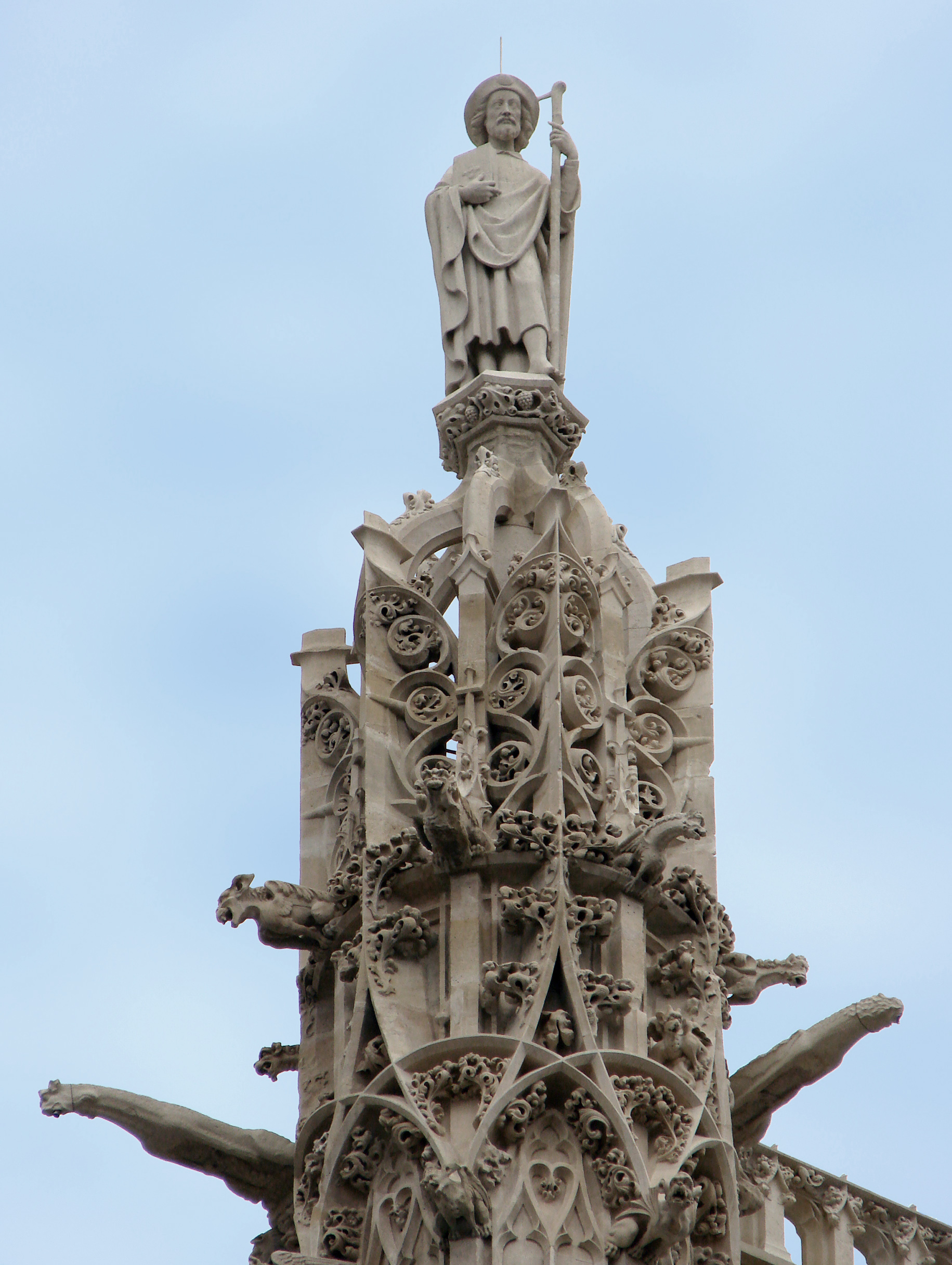
Pinnacle sculpture by Paul Chenillon

== See also ==
- Fontaine du Palmier
- Place du Châtelet
