= Guillaume Ballu =

French politician

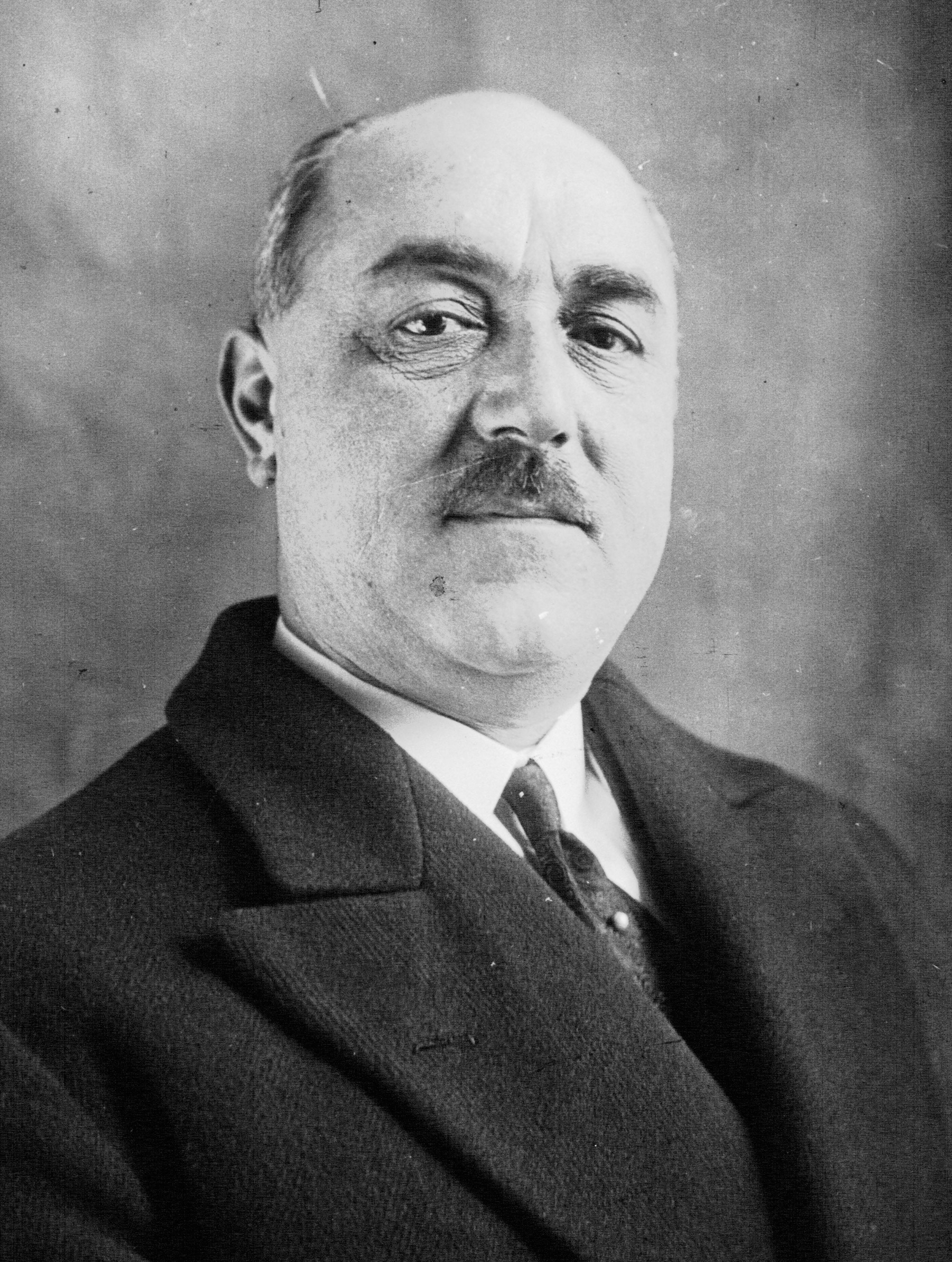
Guillaume Ballu I. 1932

Guillaume Ballu (27 May 1885, Gournay-sur-Marne – 11 May 1968) was a French politician. He belonged to the Democratic Republican Alliance and joined the Democratic and Social Action from 1928 to 1932 and the Republican Centre from 1932 to 1936. He was a member of the Chamber of Deputies from 1928 to 1936.
