= Charles Quef =

French organist and composer

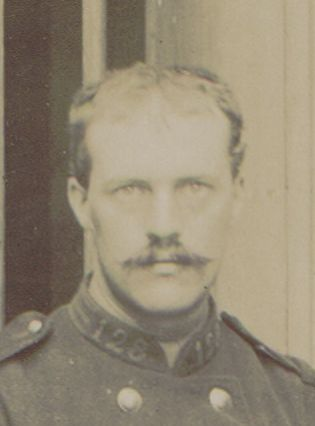
Charles Quef

Charles Paul Florimond Quef (1 November 1873, Lille – 2 July 1931, Paris) was a French organist and composer.

He studied at the conservatory in Lille, and later he attended the Paris Conservatory where he studied with Charles-Marie Widor, Louis Vierne and Alexandre Guilmant. From 1895 to 1898, he was organist of the Église Sainte-Marie-des-Batignolles and in 1898, organist of the Saint-Laurent church, Paris. In the same year, he was awarded the First prize for organ at the conservatory. Then he was appointed assistant organist and later, in November 1901, titular organist of the Église de la Ste.-Trinité, Paris, due to resignation of his predecessor Guilmant. He retained this post until his death in 1931.

== Discography ==
• 2021 : Organ Works vol. 1 – Acte Préalable AP0491

• 2022 : Organ Works vol. 2 – Acte Préalable AP0535

• 2023 : Organ Works vol. 3 – Acte Préalable AP0555

• 2024 : Organ Works vol. 4 – Acte Préalable AP0570
