= Sainte-Trinité, Paris =

Church located in Paris, France

Coordinates: 48°52′38″N 2°19′53″E

Église de la Sainte-Trinité
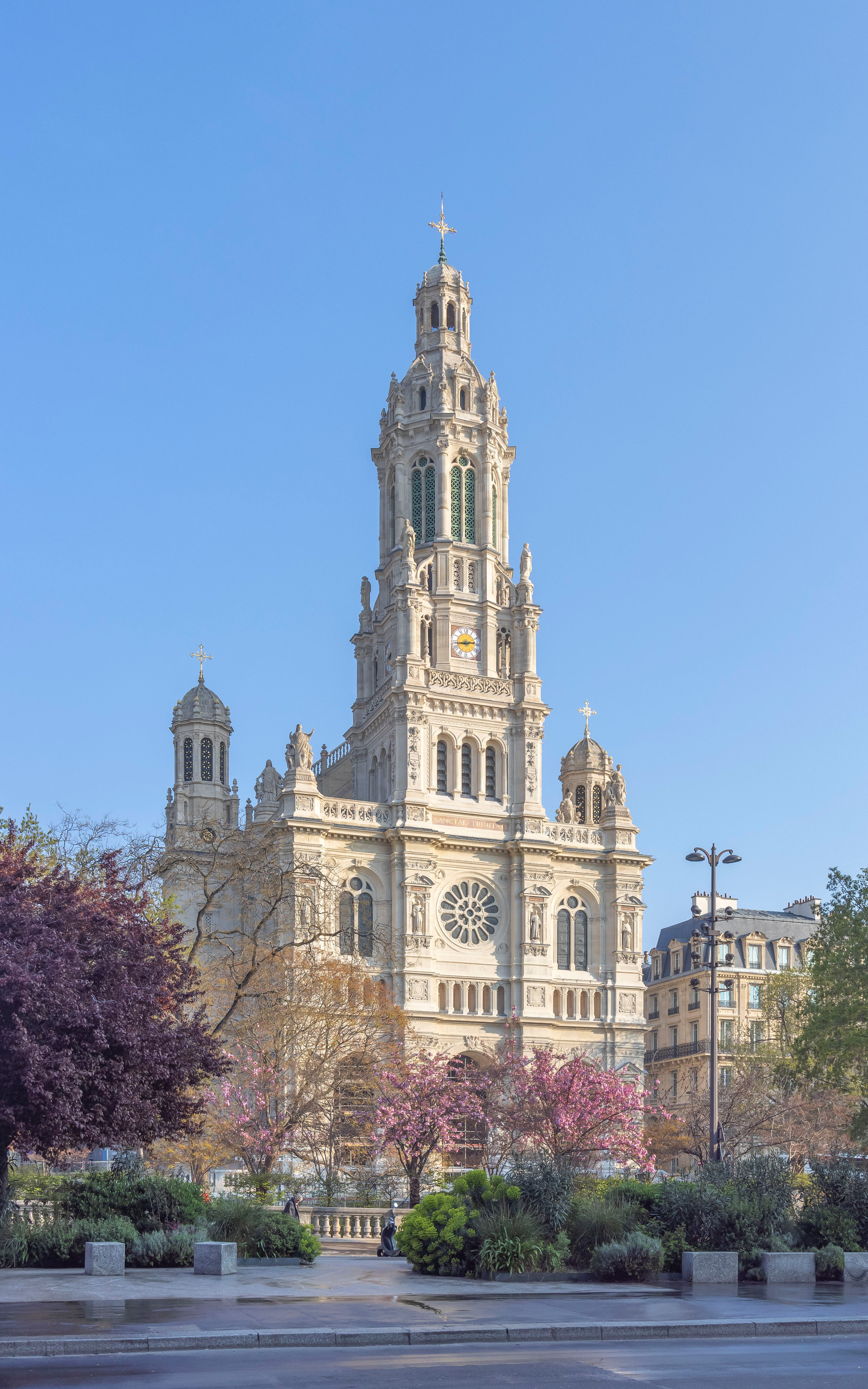
- Église de la Sainte-Trinité in 2026

Religion
- Affiliation: Catholic Church
- Province: Archdiocese of Paris
- Rite: Roman Rite
- Status: Active

Location
- Location: Place d'Estienne d'Orves, 3 rue de la Trinité, 9th arrondissement, Paris
- Interactive map of Église de la Sainte-Trinité

Architecture
- Architect: Theodore Ballu
- Style: Neo-Renaissance or Second Empire Style
- Groundbreaking: 1861
- Completed: 1867

Website
- Website of the church

The Église de la Sainte-Trinité (French pronunciation: [eɡliz də la sɛ̃t tʁinite]) is a Roman Catholic church located on the place d'Estienne d'Orves, at 3 rue de la Trinité, in the 9th arrondissement of Paris. It was built between 1861 and 1867 during the reign of Emperor Napoleon III, in the residential neighborhood of the Chaussée d'Antin. It is in the ornate Neo-Renaissance or Second Empire Style, with a highly visible 65-meter-tall belfry.

The church is accessible by the Métro (the nearby station, Trinité, is named after it). The rue de La Trinité also takes its name from the church.

== History ==
The first church in the parish, which was then outside the city limits of Paris, was constructed en 1850 at 21 rue de Calais, but was too small for growing population and too far from the center of the parish. A second church was built in 1852 on the rue de Clichy, where the present-day Casino de Paris is located, but it also was too small. The Abbé Modelonde, the curé of the parish, appealed to Napoleon III to construct a larger new church.

The church was part of the project for rebuilding and beautifying Paris carried out by Napoleon III and his prefect of the Seine, Baron Haussmann during the Second French Empire. This included the creation of new boulevards, parks and squares, and new landmarks such as the Paris Opera. La Trinité, as it became known, was designed by to serve a growing residential community in the Chaussée d'Antin, which Napoleon III had brought into Paris by expanding the city limits. The church and other new buildings Napoleon IIi commissioned were designed to be tall and visible, and were placed at the meeting points of the new avenues that criss-crossed the city.

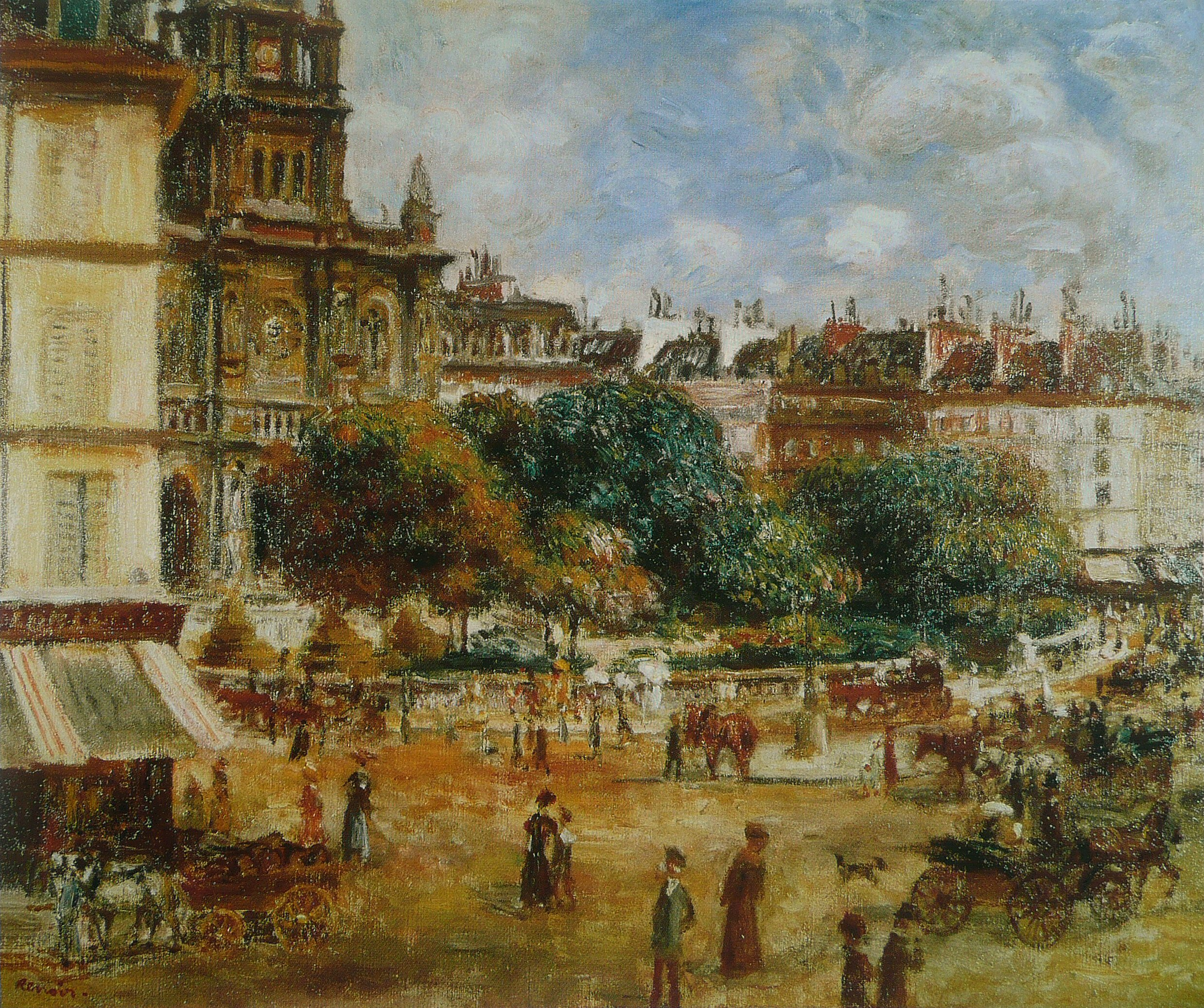
The Place de la Trinité and the facade of the church (left) painted by Pierre-Auguste Renoir (1875)

The architect was Théodore Ballu, chief architect of Paris for religious buildings, whose other Paris works included the restoration of the Saint-Jacques Tower, (1854–58); the belfry of Saint-Germain-l'Auxerrois (1858–63); and the Église Saint-Ambroise, (1863–69). Construction began in 1861 and was largely completed by 1867, but it was not entirely finished and consecrated until 1913.

In the winter of 1870–71, when Paris was surrounded and besieged by the Prussians in the Franco-Prussian War, the church was put to use as a hospital, since it was one of the few large Paris buildings with a working furnace. A large stove was also placed in the nave, which darkened the ceiling with its smoke. The chapels were turned into a pharmacy, linen closet, laundry and storerooms, and a large stove was placed in the nave to provide additional heat.

During the Paris Commune, on 12 May 1871, the building was confiscated from the Catholic church and used as a meeting hall for a club of Communard women called the Club of Deliverance. During the Semaine Sanglante, the final battle of the Commune, the furniture was piled up and the church was armed as a Commune fortress, but the Commundards were forced to withdraw when the church was bypassed by the advancing French army.

The church had a particular connection with French music: it was the location of Gioachino Rossini's funeral, on 13 November 1868; Hector Berlioz's funeral, on 11 March 1869; and Georges Bizet's funeral in 1875. Later, in 1931, composer Olivier Messiaen was appointed organist at the church, a post which he would hold until his death 61 years later.

The church's facade served as the inspiration for the design of the Saint-Jean-Baptiste Church in Quebec City and the Cathedral of the Blessed Sacrament in Sacramento, California.

== Exterior ==
The exterior of the church has elements of French Renaissance architecture combined with Italian Renaissance architecture, which were often joined in imaginative ways during the reign of Napoleon III. The most impressive feature is the bell tower, 65 meters high. The lower bell tower is square, topped by an octagonal tower crowned by a dome, in the style of French Renaissance architecture. The facade is given symmetry and harmony by two smaller domed bell towers on the corners.

The sculptures in the niches of the facade were made by different prominent Paris artists, most of whom were winners of the prestigious Prix de Rome. One group depicts doctors of the church defending it against various heresies; another group depicts saints. Groups of statues on either side of the facade depict the Cardinal Virtues, Prudence, Justice, Temperance and Force. The statue of "Strength", is by sculptor James Pradier(1792–1852), and carries a sword on his right side. "Temperance" was made by Jean-Baptiste Carpeaux (1827–1875)

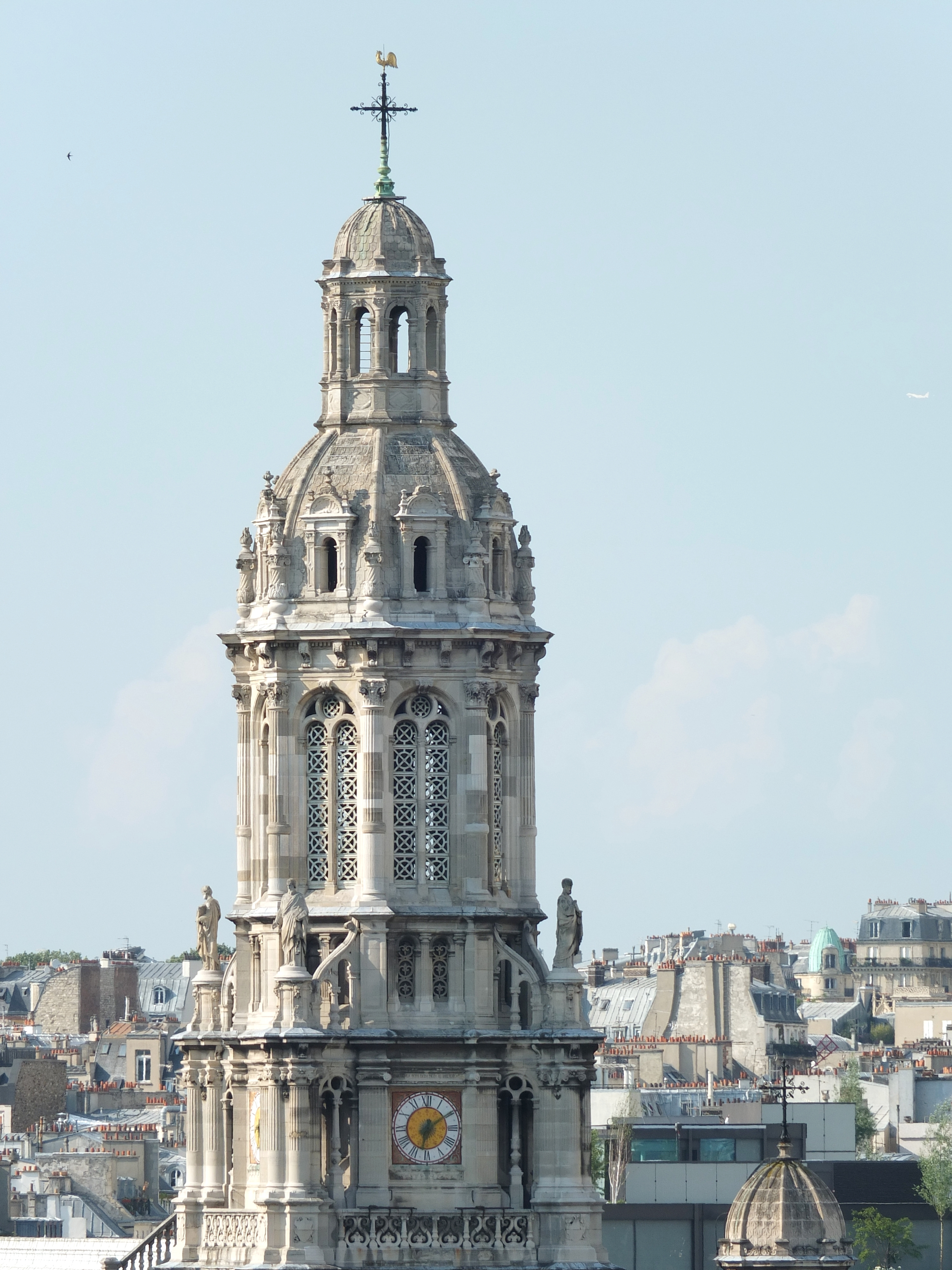
The Bell tower

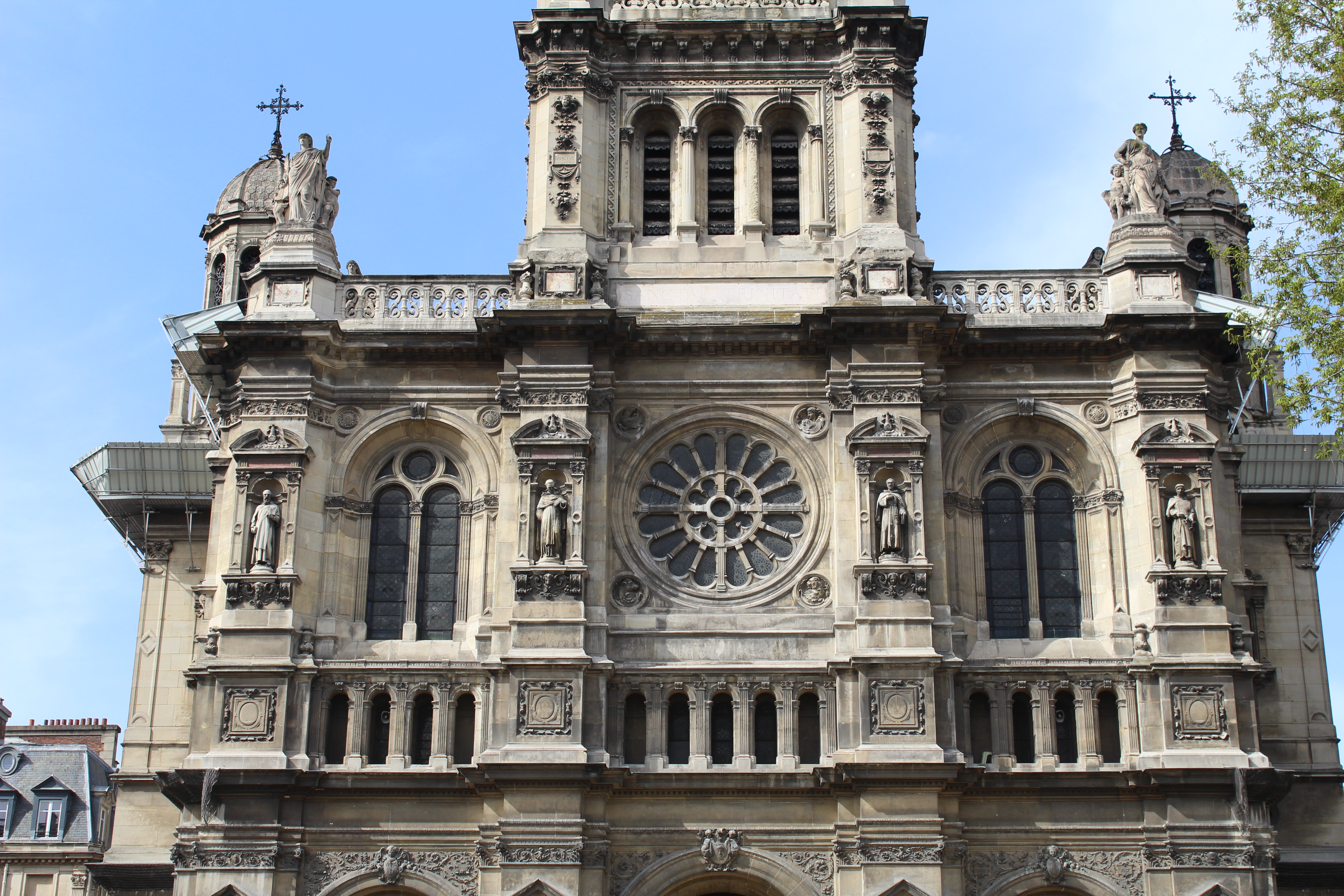
Detail of the upper façade

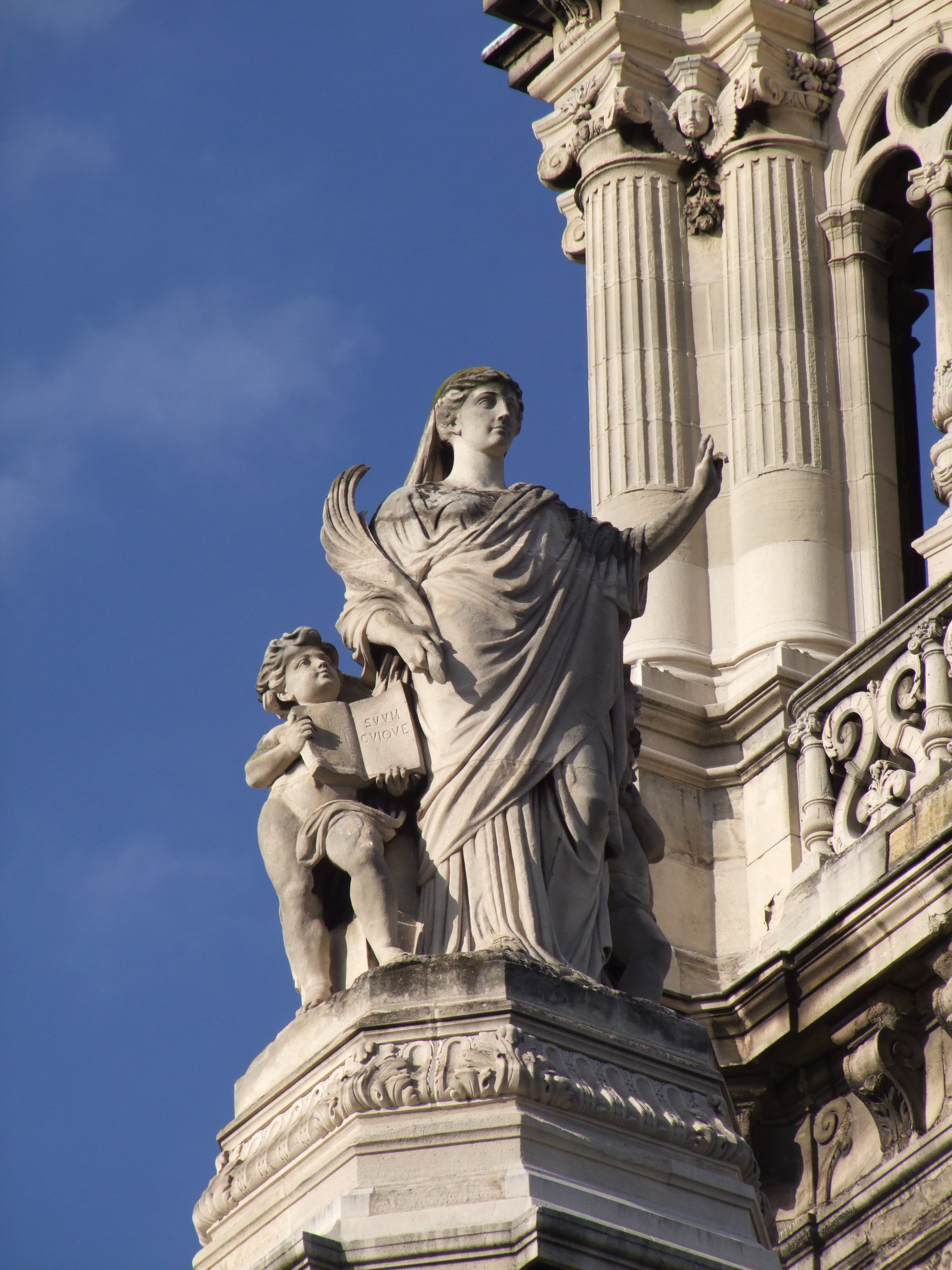
Sculpture on the cornice of the façade

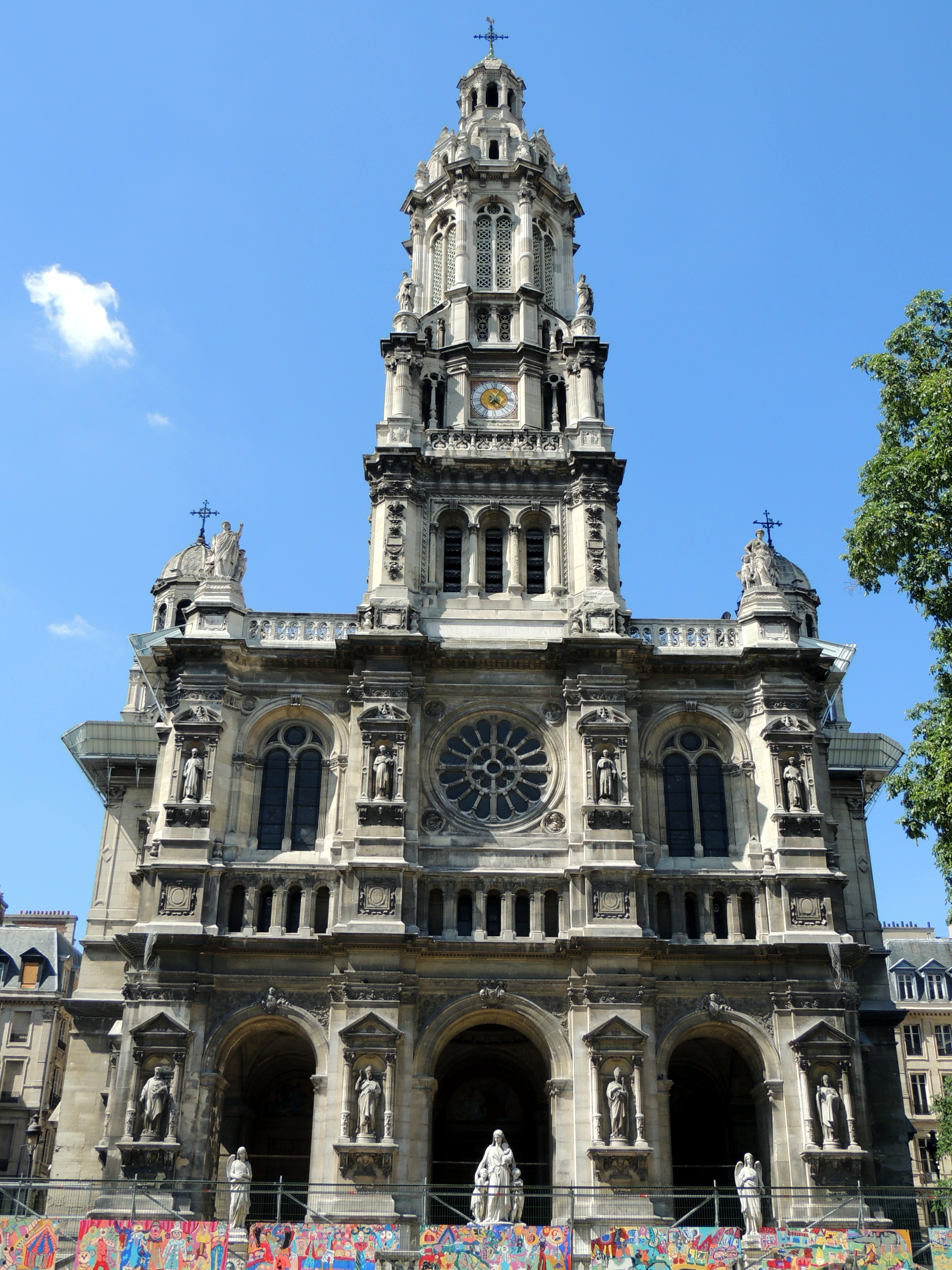
The façade

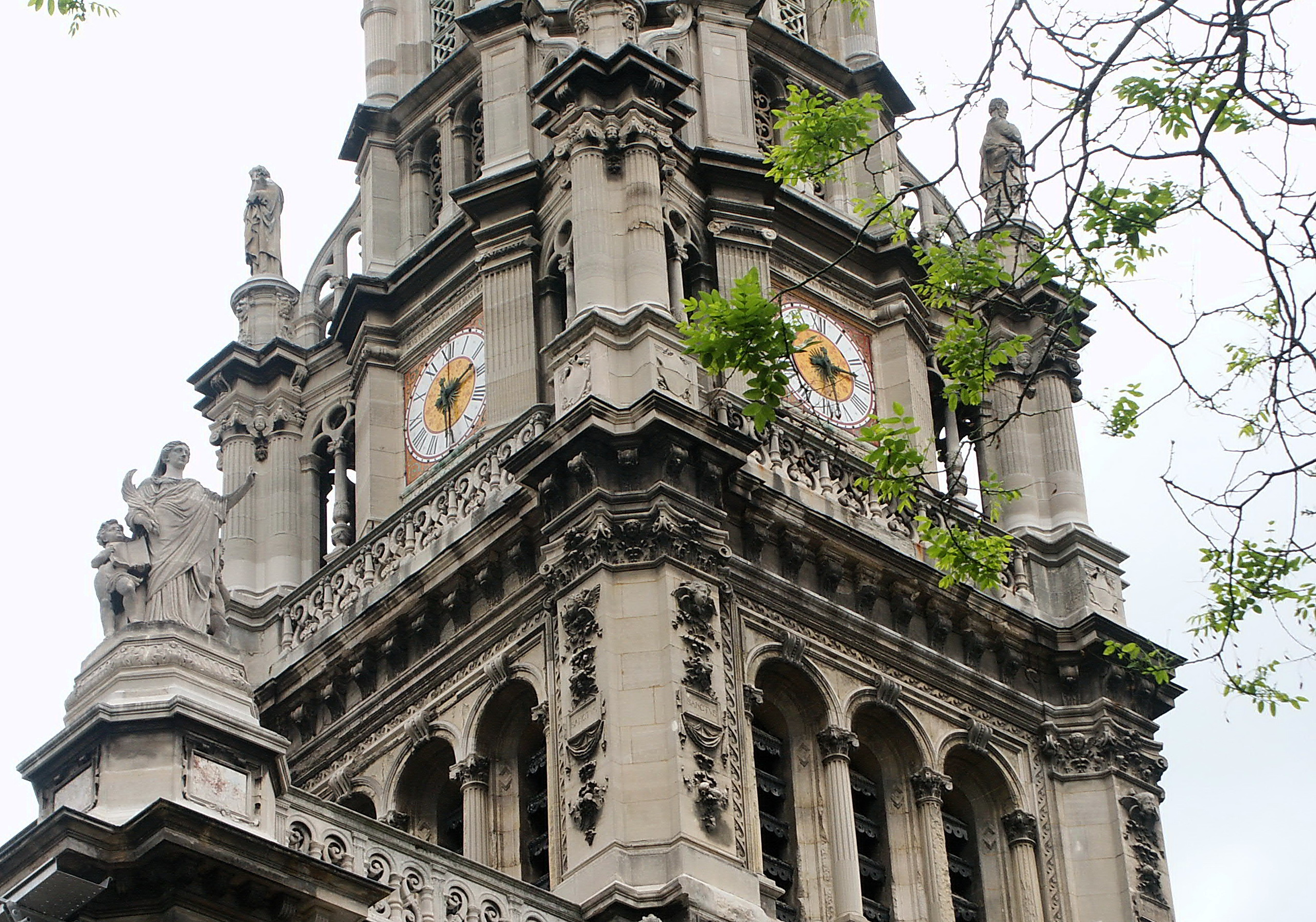
Detail of the bell tower

== Interior ==
The 93-meter-long church has an iron frame, which allowed much greater open space in the interior. The interior is lavishly decorated, a feature enhanced by the large windows on the upper level made with a minimum of colored glass and a majority of white decor glass, which provide abundant light. Polychrome paintings decorate much of the top level, contrasting with the white walls and columns of the lower level, and the entire interior has lavish sculptural decoration.

=== Nave ===
The nave has two levels. The lower level is decorated with pillars alongside composite columns. Each column has two statues of apostles, identified by their symbols. The second level has a tribune which was originally intended for the use of Emperor Napoleon III. Over the tribune is a triumphal arch painted with a scene from the Apocalypse described by Saint John, "Christ and the Easter Lamb", by the painter Jobbé-Duval.

The nave is lined on both sides by small chapels, each with abundant decoration. The sculpture and paintings in the chapels are the work of Paris artists, the majority of whom had studied their art at the Academy in Rome run by the French Academy in Rome. Paris.

The carvings of the pulpit in the nave were made by the artist Denuelle. It is similar to the pulpit in the church of Saint-François-Xavier, Paris, from the same period.

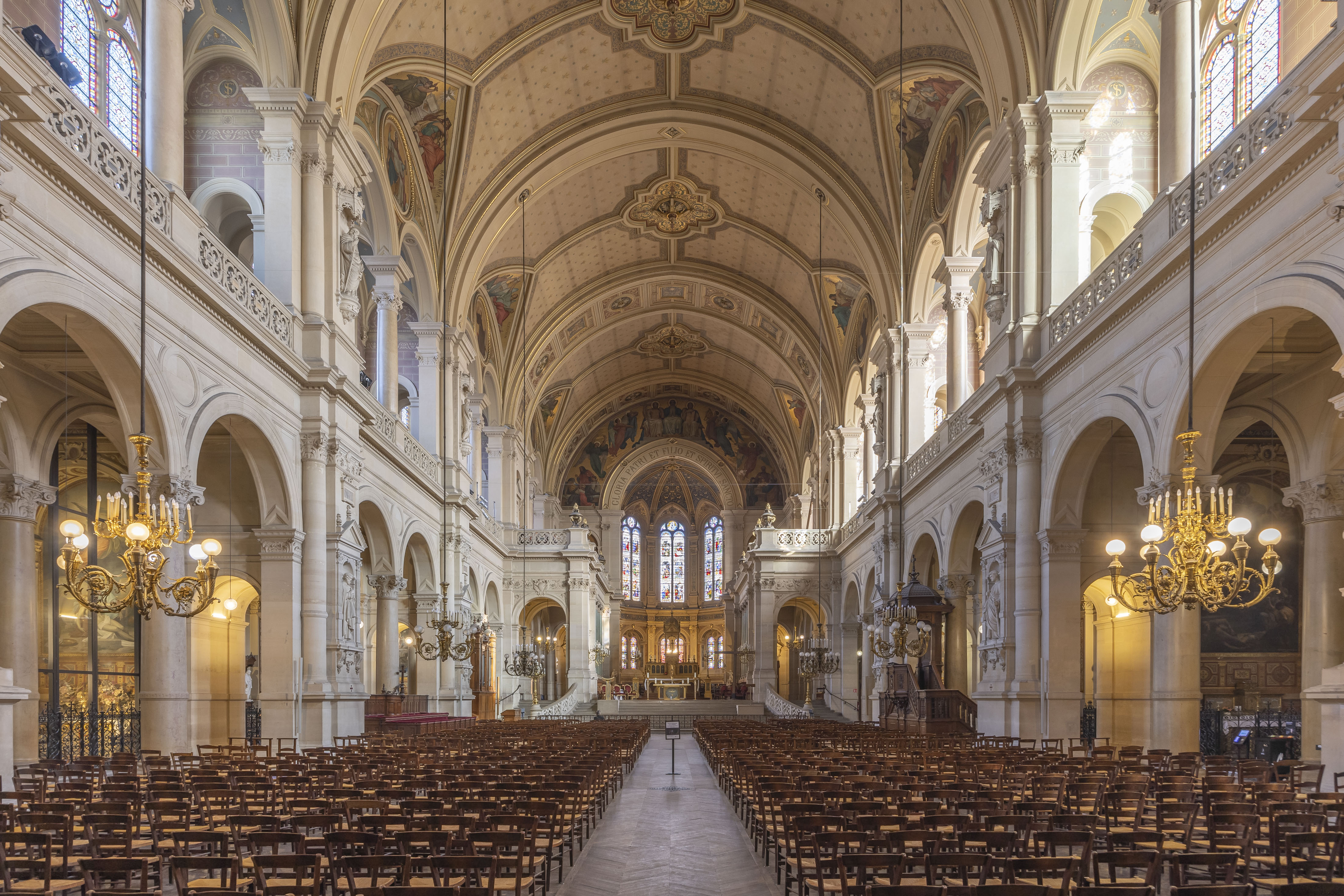
The nave, facing the choir

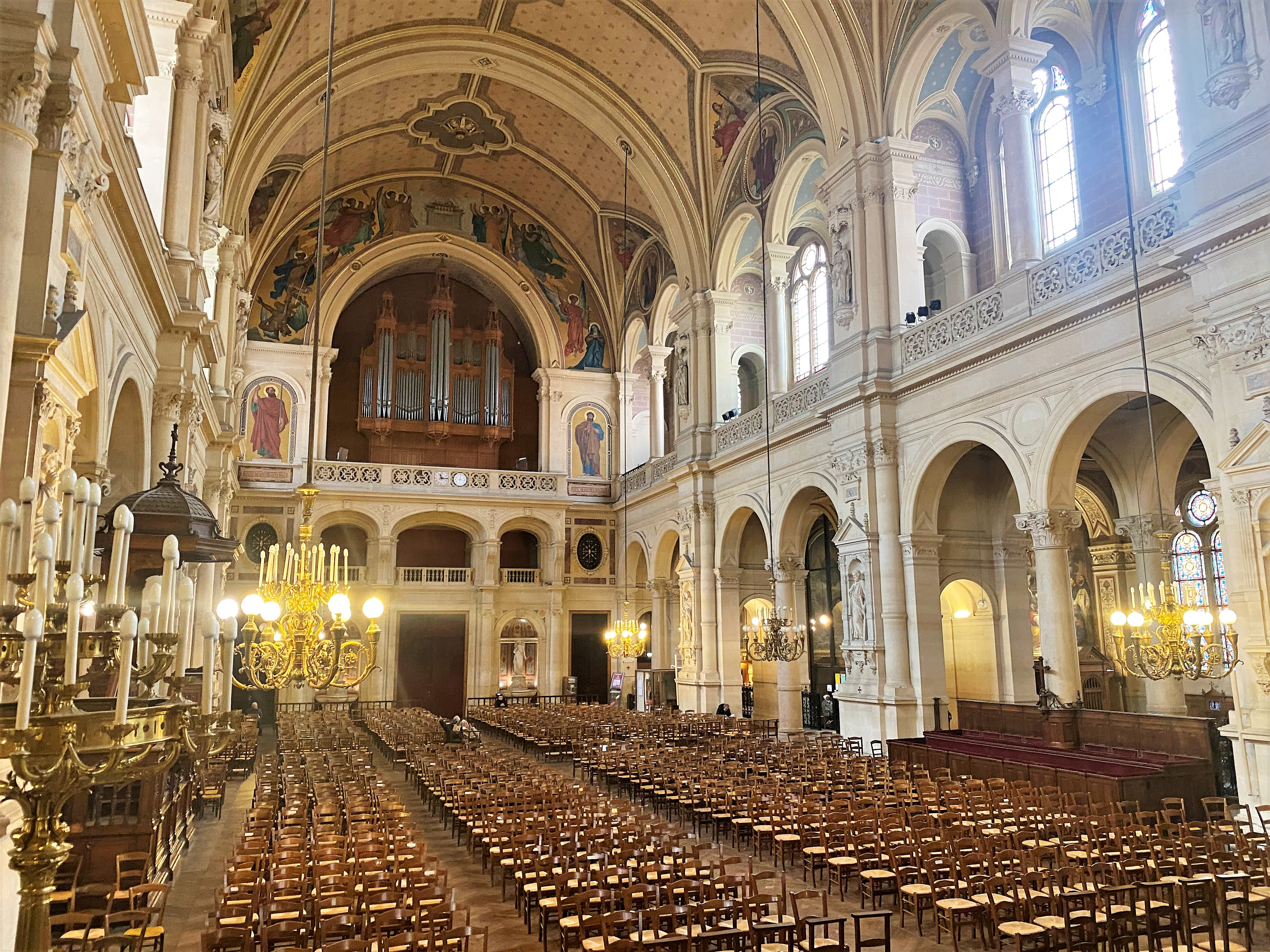
Rear of the church. The nave and organ on the tribune over the portal

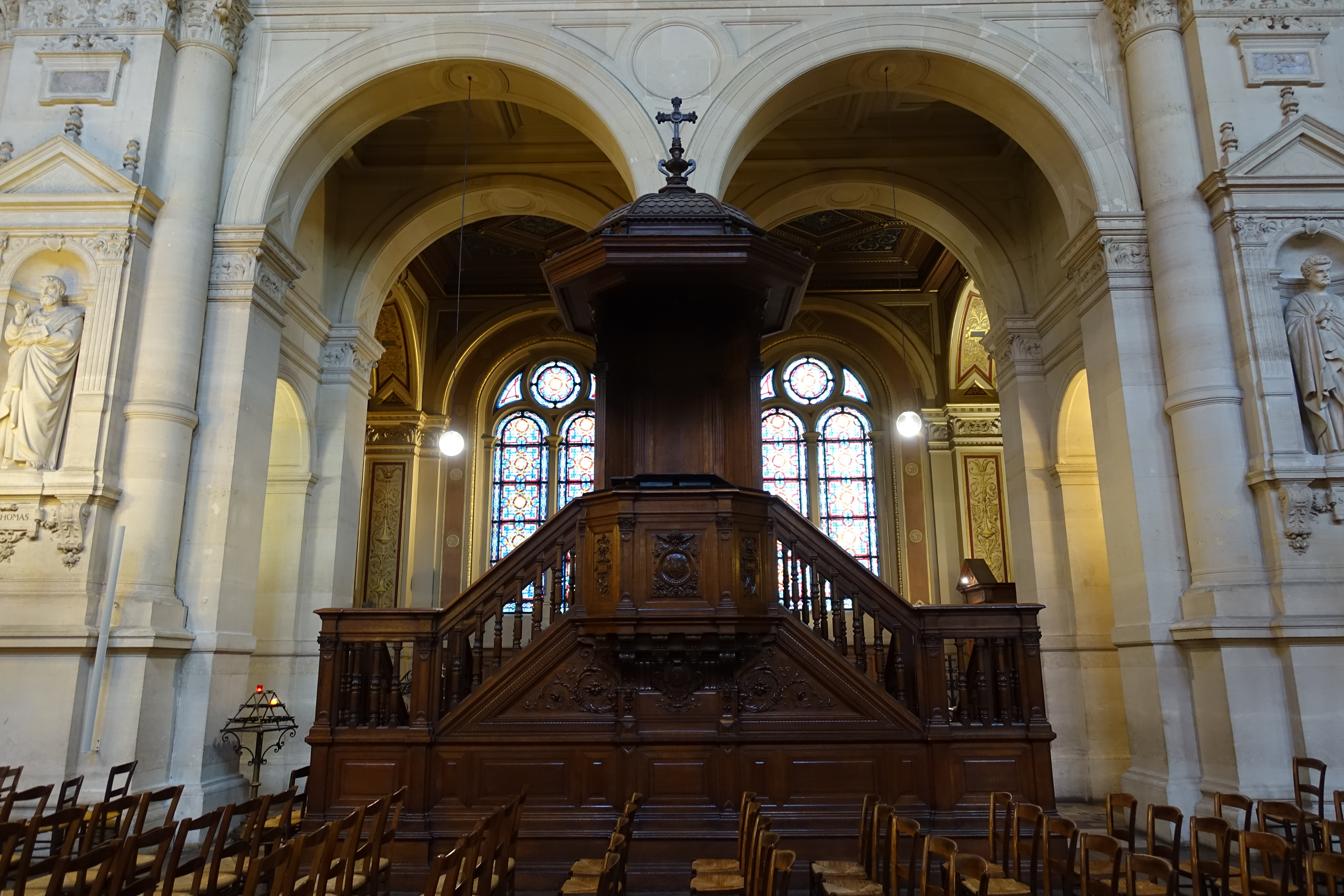
The pulpit in the nave, where sermons were read

=== Choir ===
The choir is ten steps higher than the nave, due to the sloping site under the church, and is surrounded by an ambulatory. The central element of the choir is an immense main altar, created by Puissielgue-Rusand, who also built the altar for the church of Saint-Francois-Xavier in Paris. It is surrounded by ten columns, representing the Ten Commandments. In front of the altar, on a high stand, is a more modern crucifix, which was made in 1992 by the sculptor Philippe Kaeppelin.

Over the altar is an arch with a monumental painting by Barrias, illustrating the Holy Trinity. The centre figure of God the Father is enveloping with his cloak figures of Christ and the Holy Ghost.

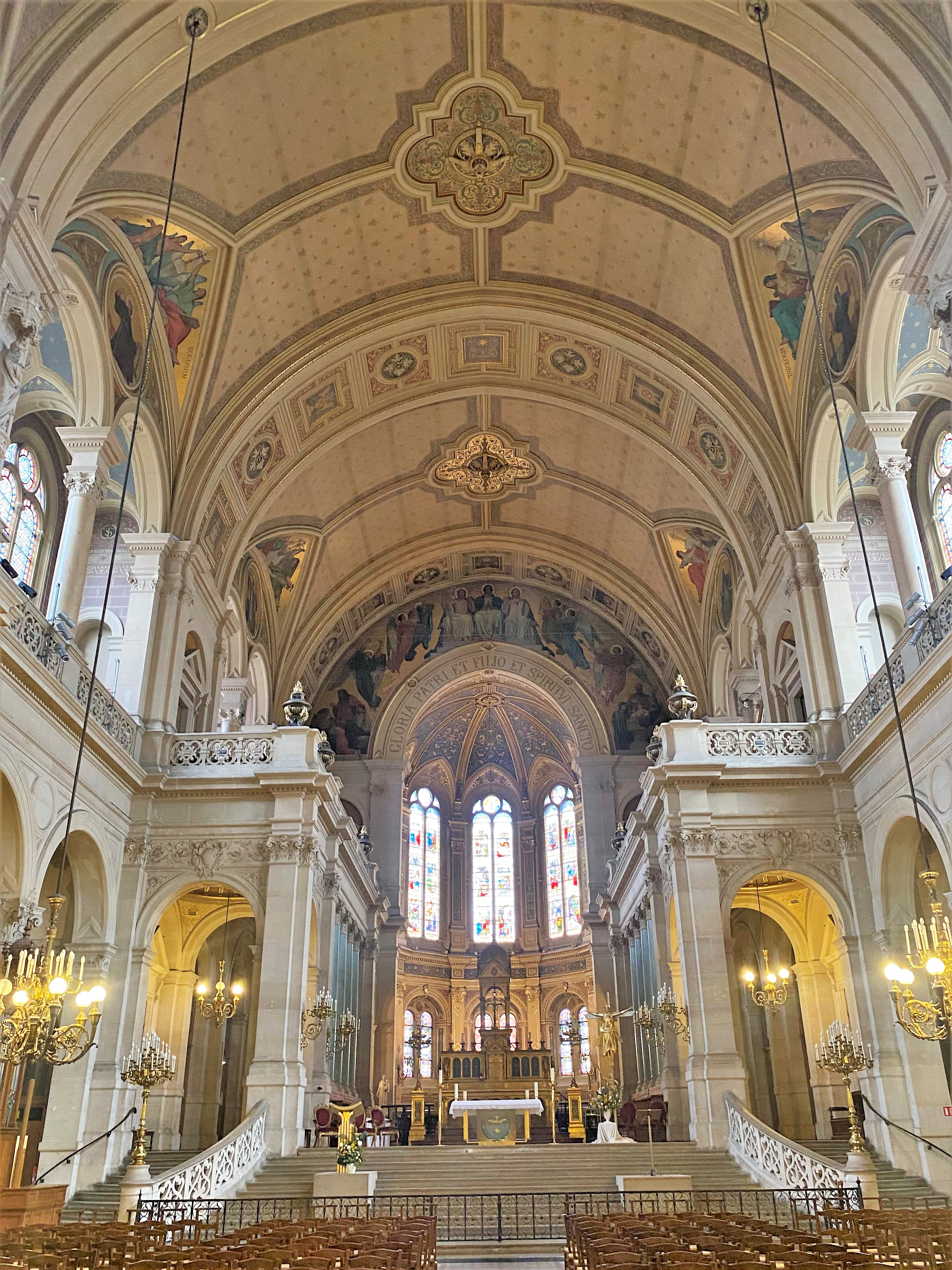
The Choir

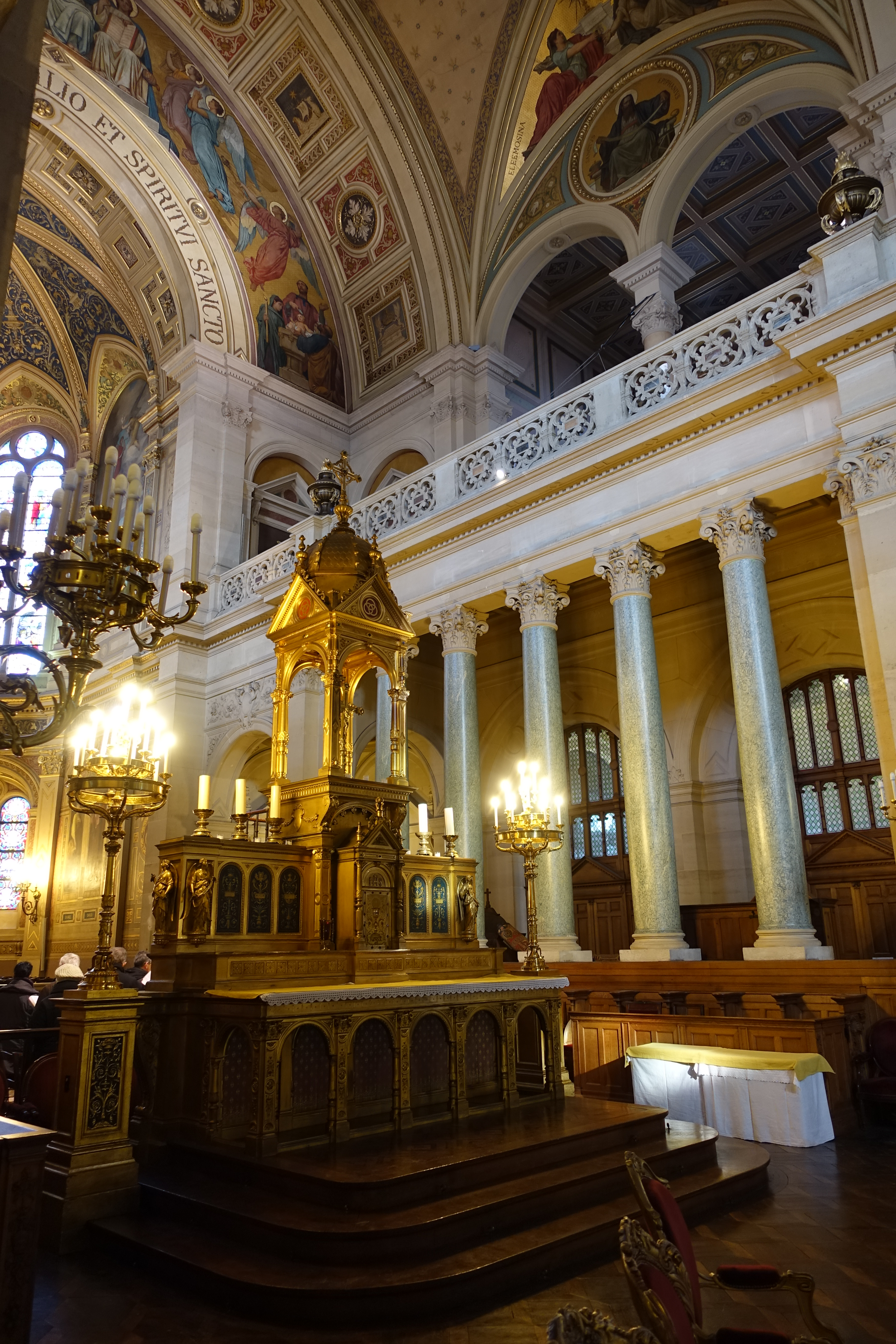
The altar in the choir

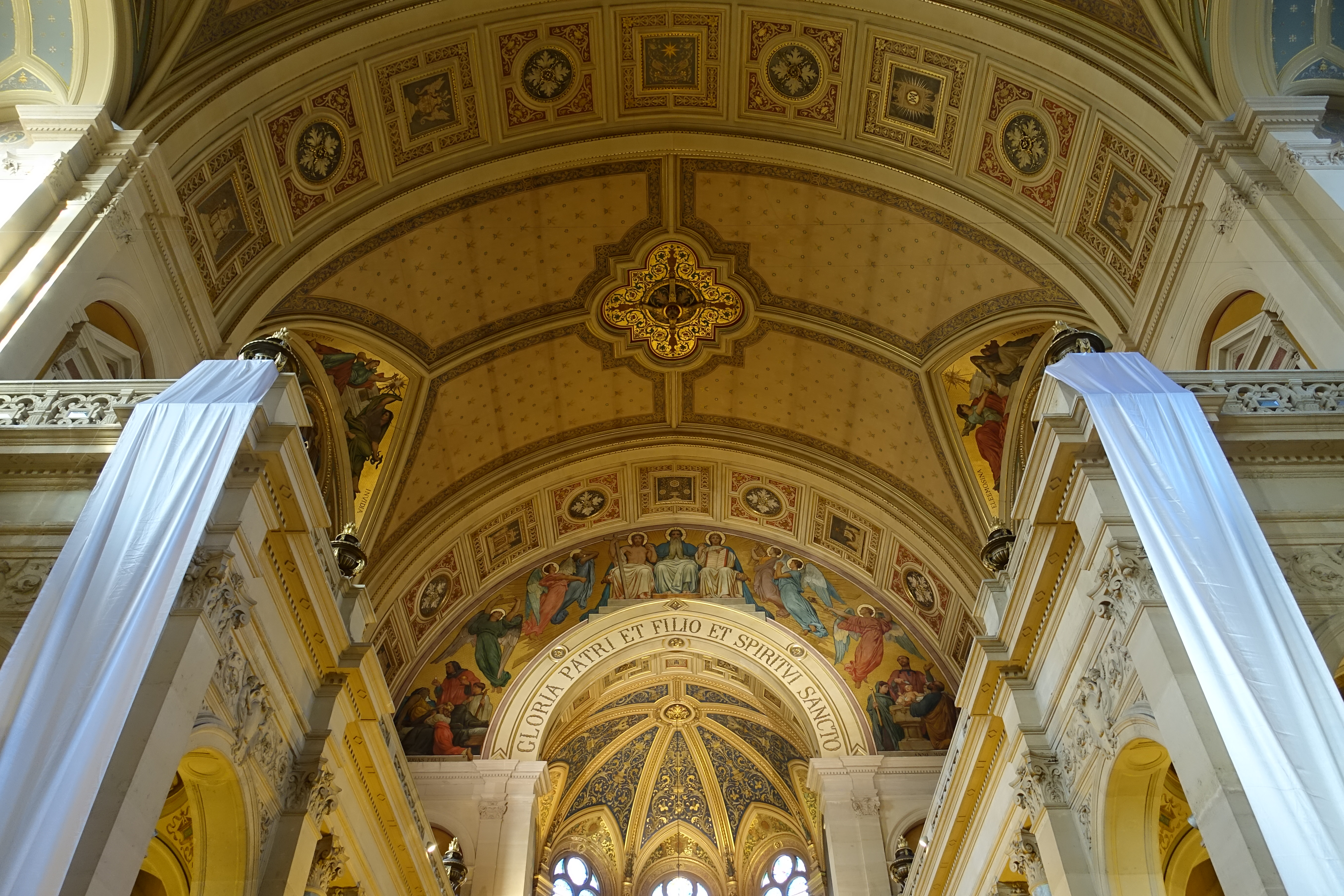
Ceiling of the Choir

=== Chapels ===
The largest chapel is the Chapel of the Virgin, placed in the traditional location in the apse directly behind the altar, facing the morning sun, and accessed by an ambulatory.

A series of small chapels are placed in the arcades on either side of the choir, each one decorated with classical paintings by artists from the Academy of Fine Arts. The artists who decorated the church chapels went on to decorate many of the new churches built in the 19th century.

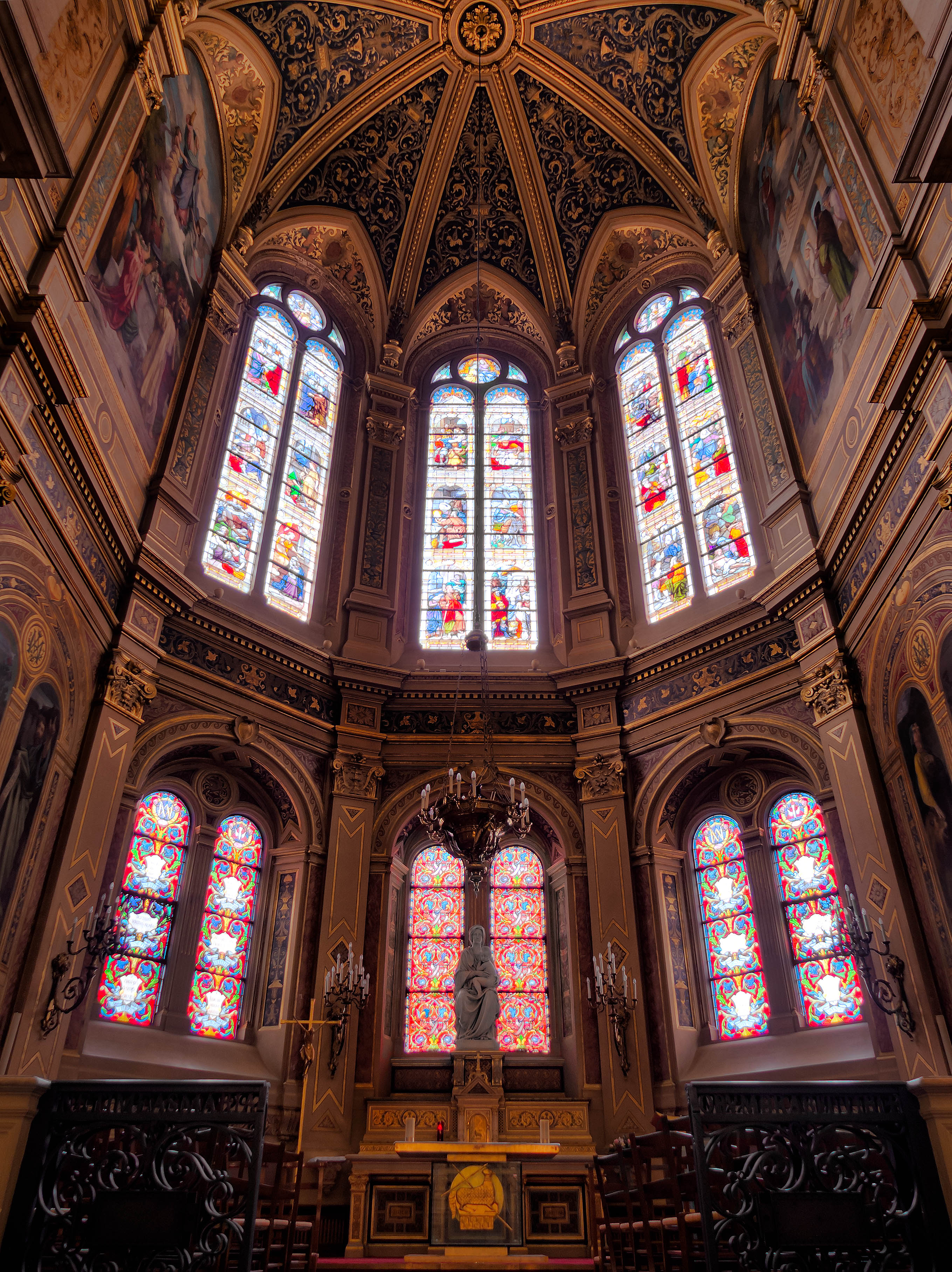
The Chapel of the Virgin, in the apse

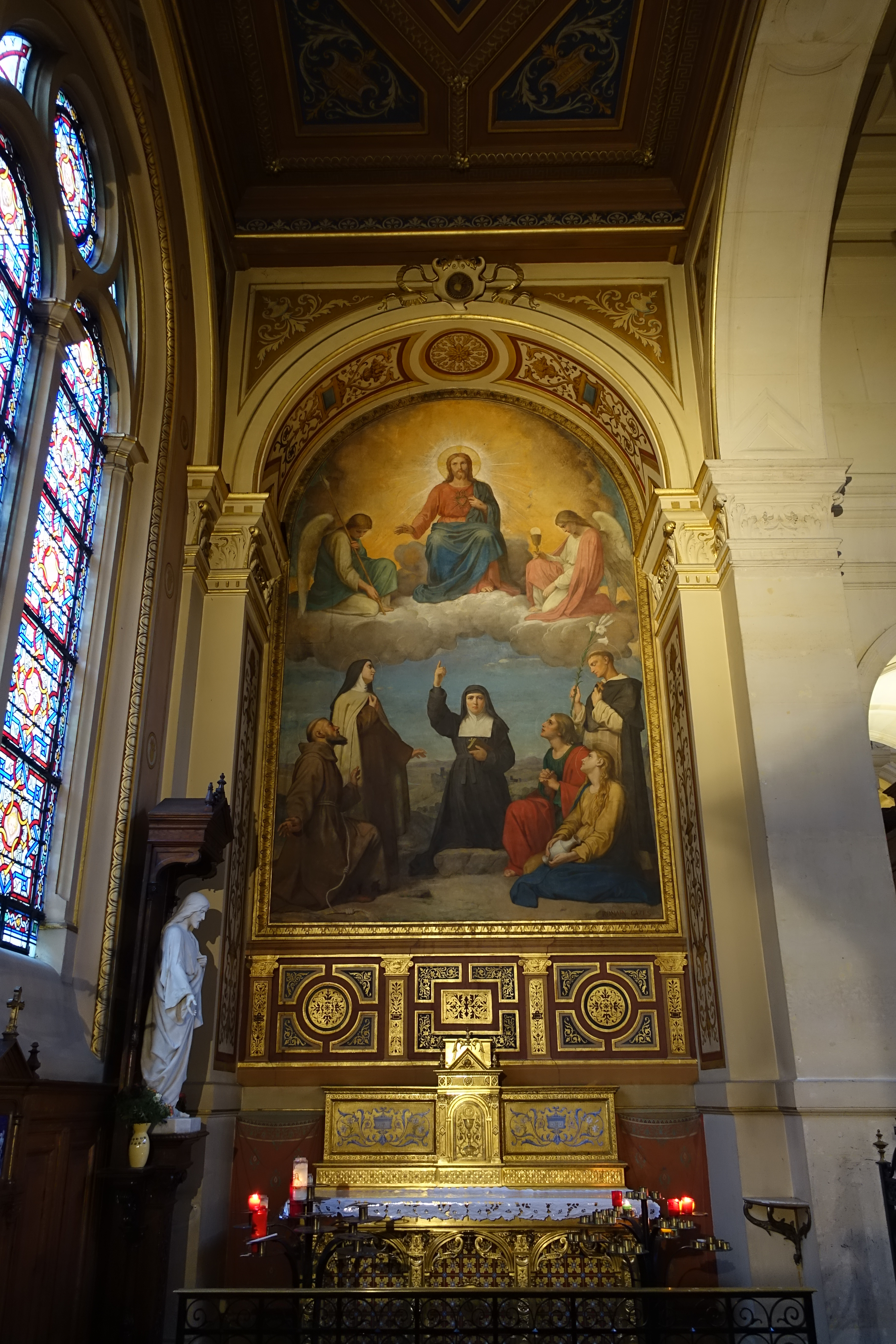
Chapel of the Sacred Heart, painting by Romain Cazes

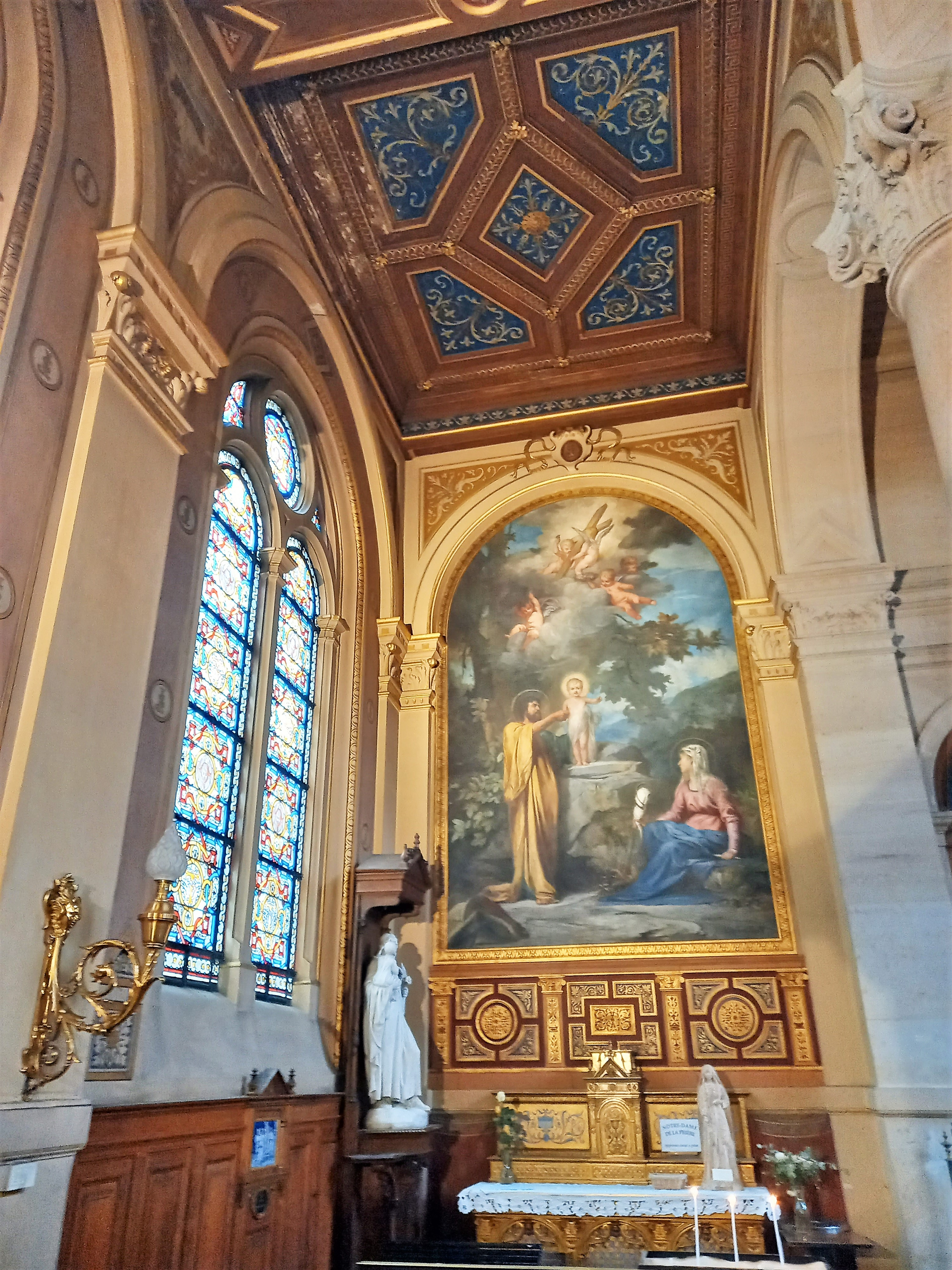
Chapel of Saint Joseph, painting of Joseph and Mary by Eugène Thirion.

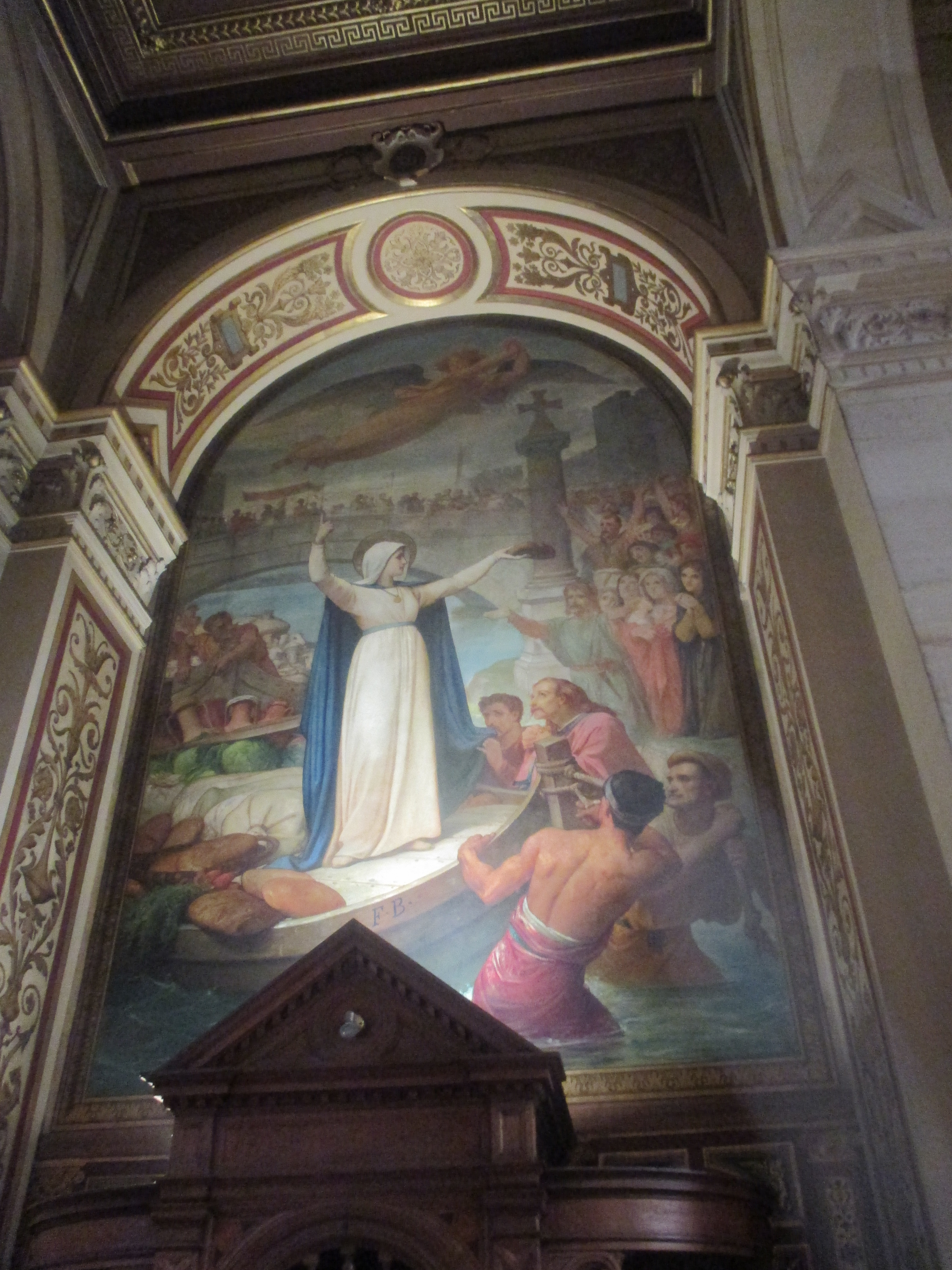
Chapel of Saint Genevieve

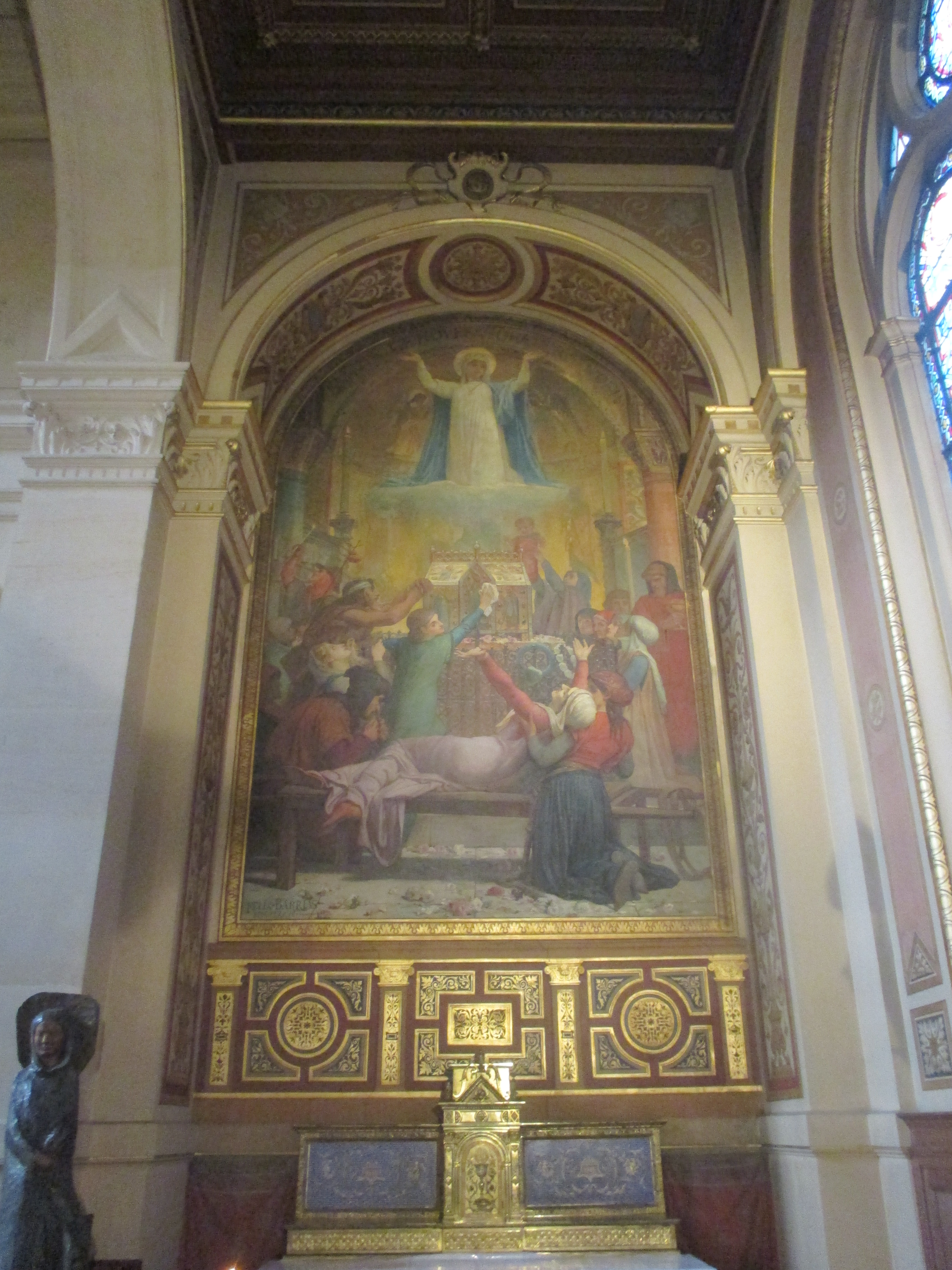
Chapel of Saint Genevieve

== Art and decoration ==
=== Paintings ===
Paintings by several of the major French history and religion painters of the 19th century, including Désiré François Laugée, and Jean-Jules-Antoine Lecomte du Nouÿ are found in the church. The decoration continues on the upper walls and the vaults, filling them with colors and floral designs.

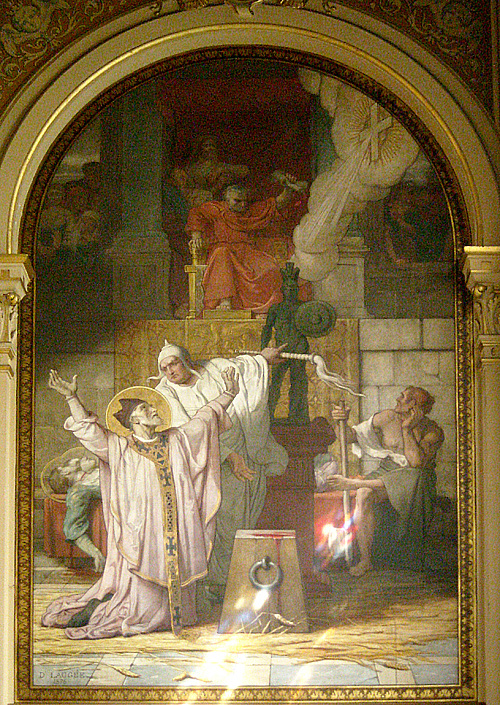
"The Death of Saint Denis" by Désiré François Laugée

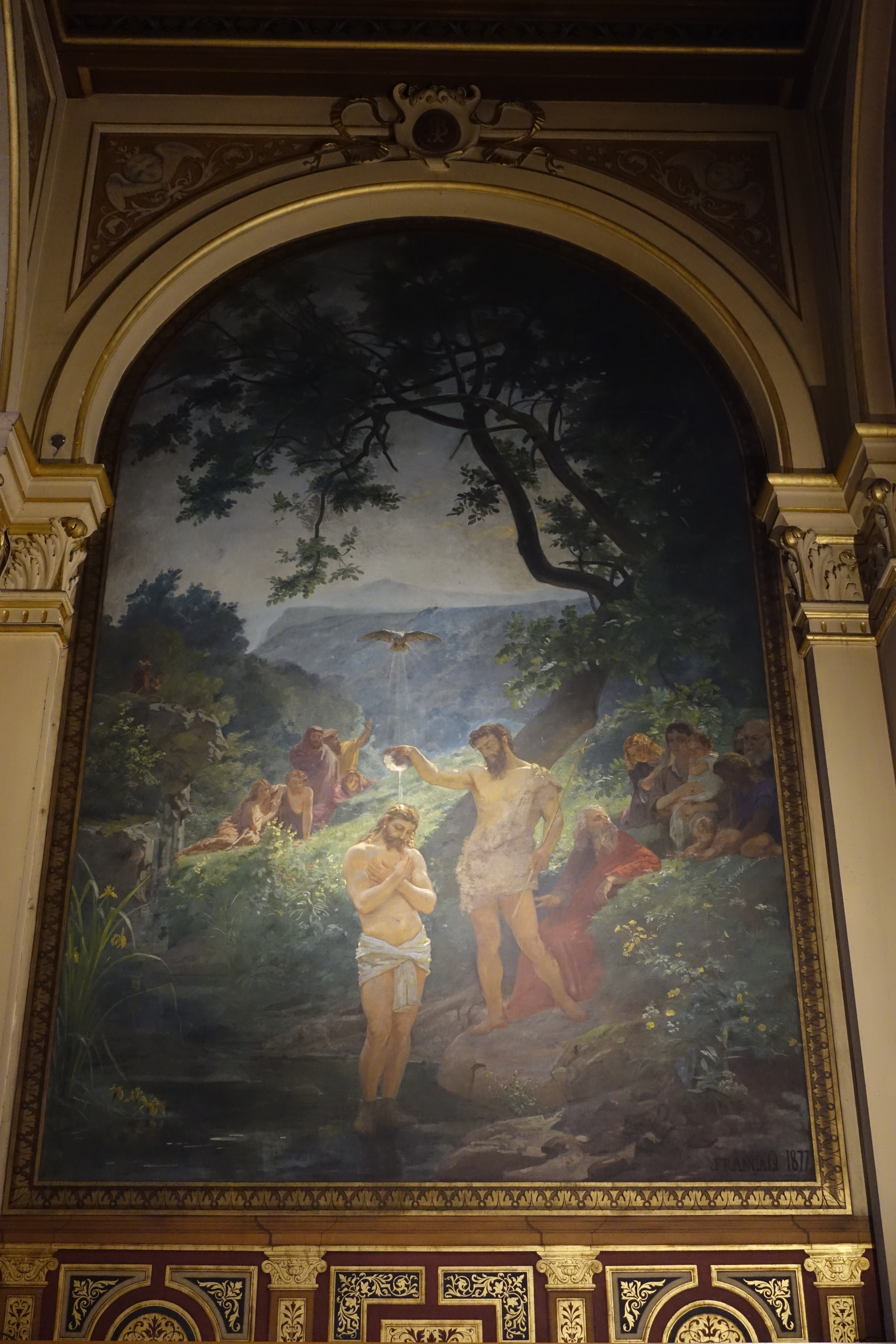
"Baptism of Christ" in the Baptistry

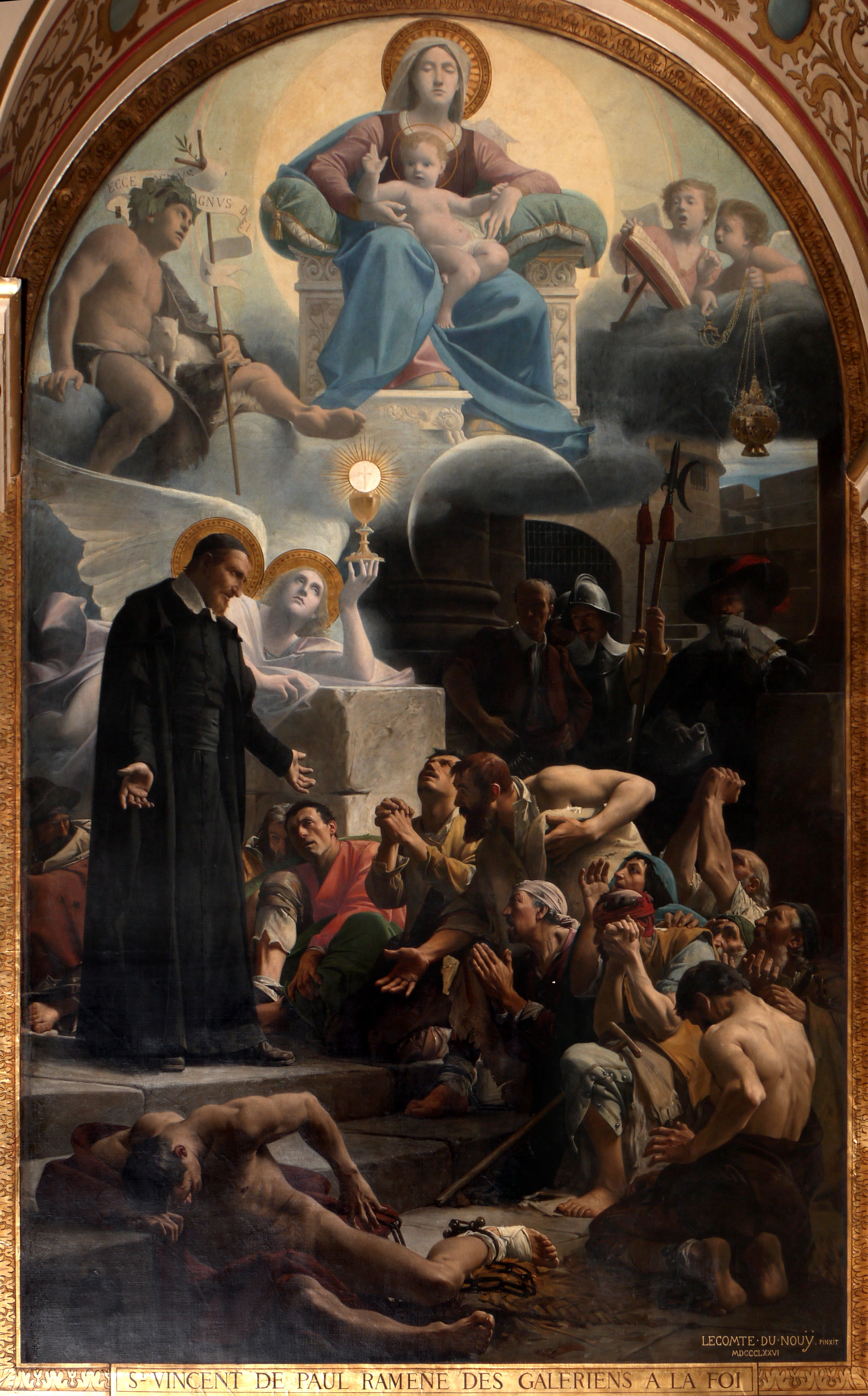
"Saint Vincent de Paul converts the Galley prisoners" by Jean-Jules-Antoine Lecomte du Nouÿ

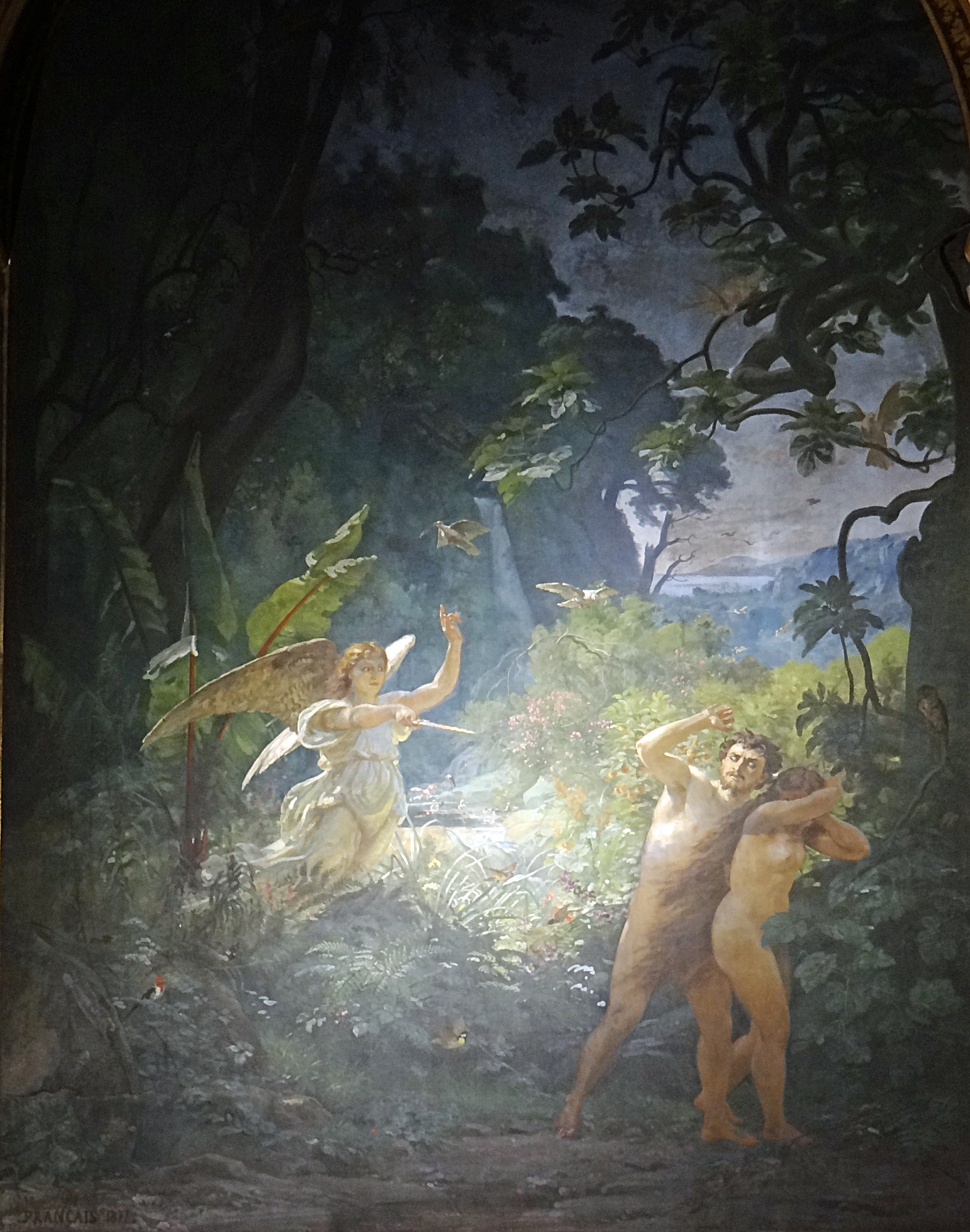
"Adam and Eve driven from Paradise" (Bapistry)

=== Sculpture ===
The church has many works made by prominent Paris sculptors both on the exterior and in the church. The sculptures of Charles Gumery, who created a marble Virgin Mary for the holy water basins at the church entrance, also made statues for the facade of the Opera Garnier, the new Paris Opera. His statue of Circe is displayed on the south façade of the Cour Carrée in the Louvre Museum (1860)

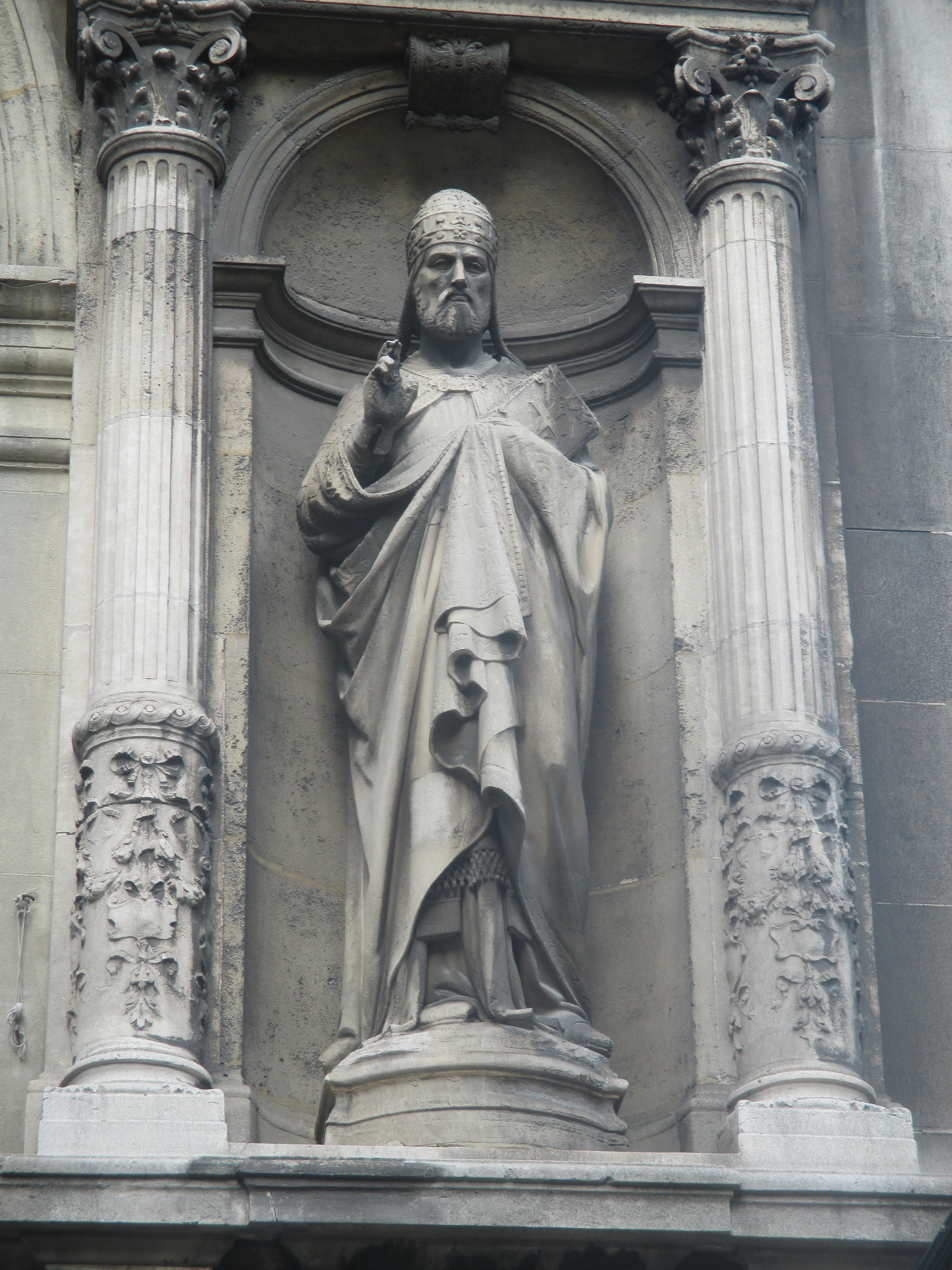
Pope Gregory I on the church facade, by Mathurin Moreau (1822-1912)

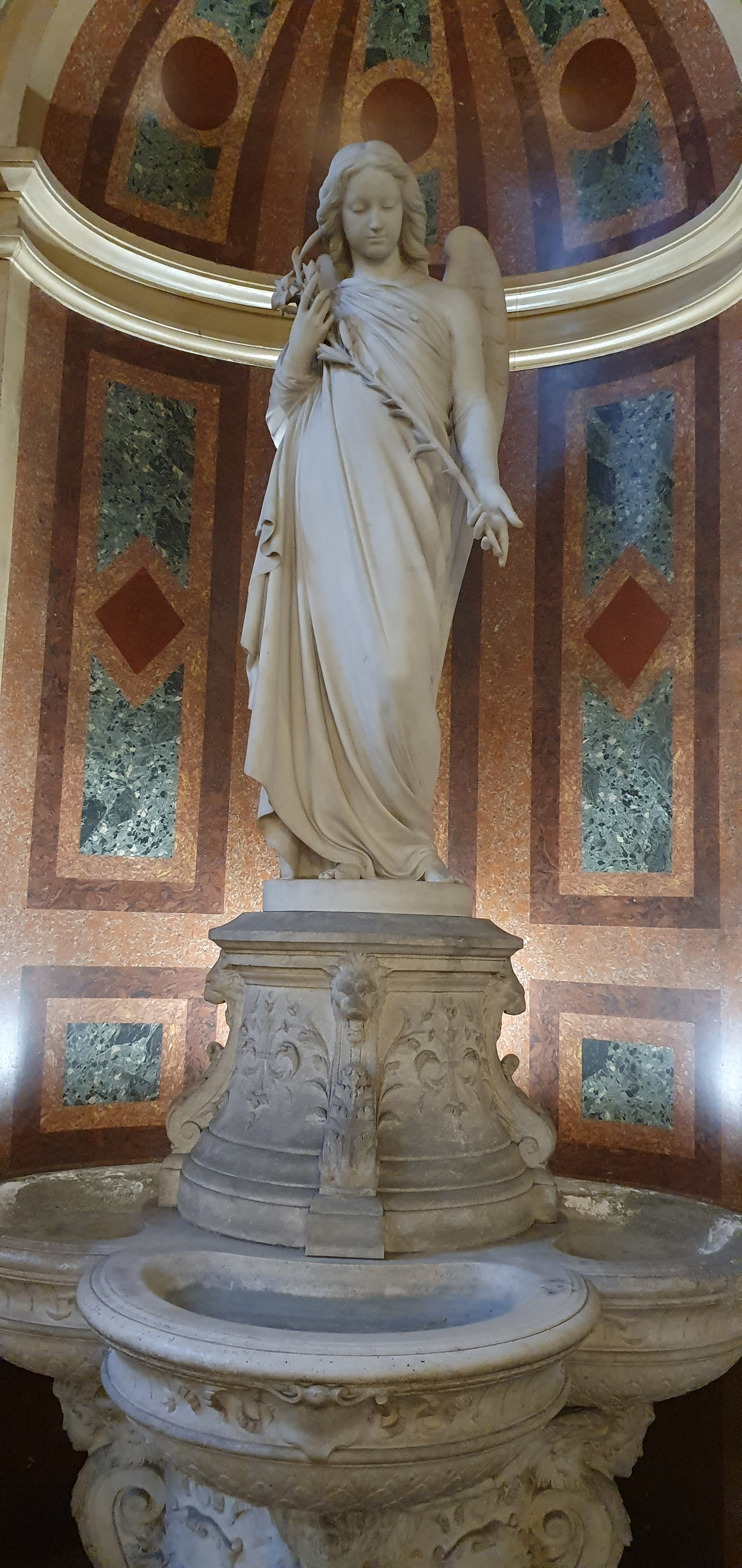
"Purity and Innocence", marble statue by Charles Gumery (1827-1881)

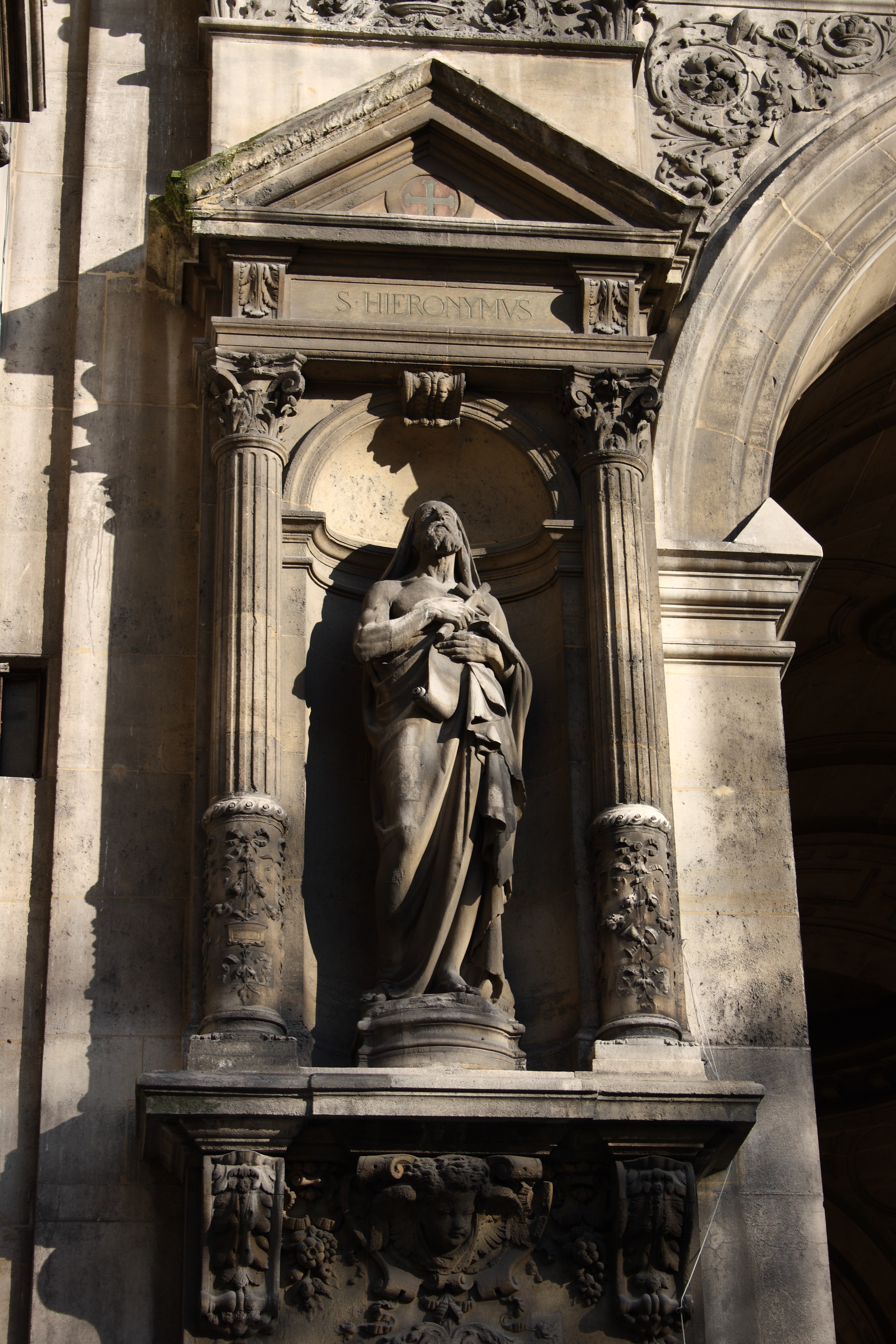
Mathurin Moreau, Saint Jérôme.

=== Stained glass ===
The church has a particularly notable collection of 19th-century stained glass. The most prominent windows are those in the Chapel of the Virgin. The upper windows in the chapel were made by Eugene Oudinot and Auguste Leloir, and illustrate scenes from the life of the Virgin. The lower windows behind the altar are more abstract and full of colour; they were made by the glass master craftsman Nicod.

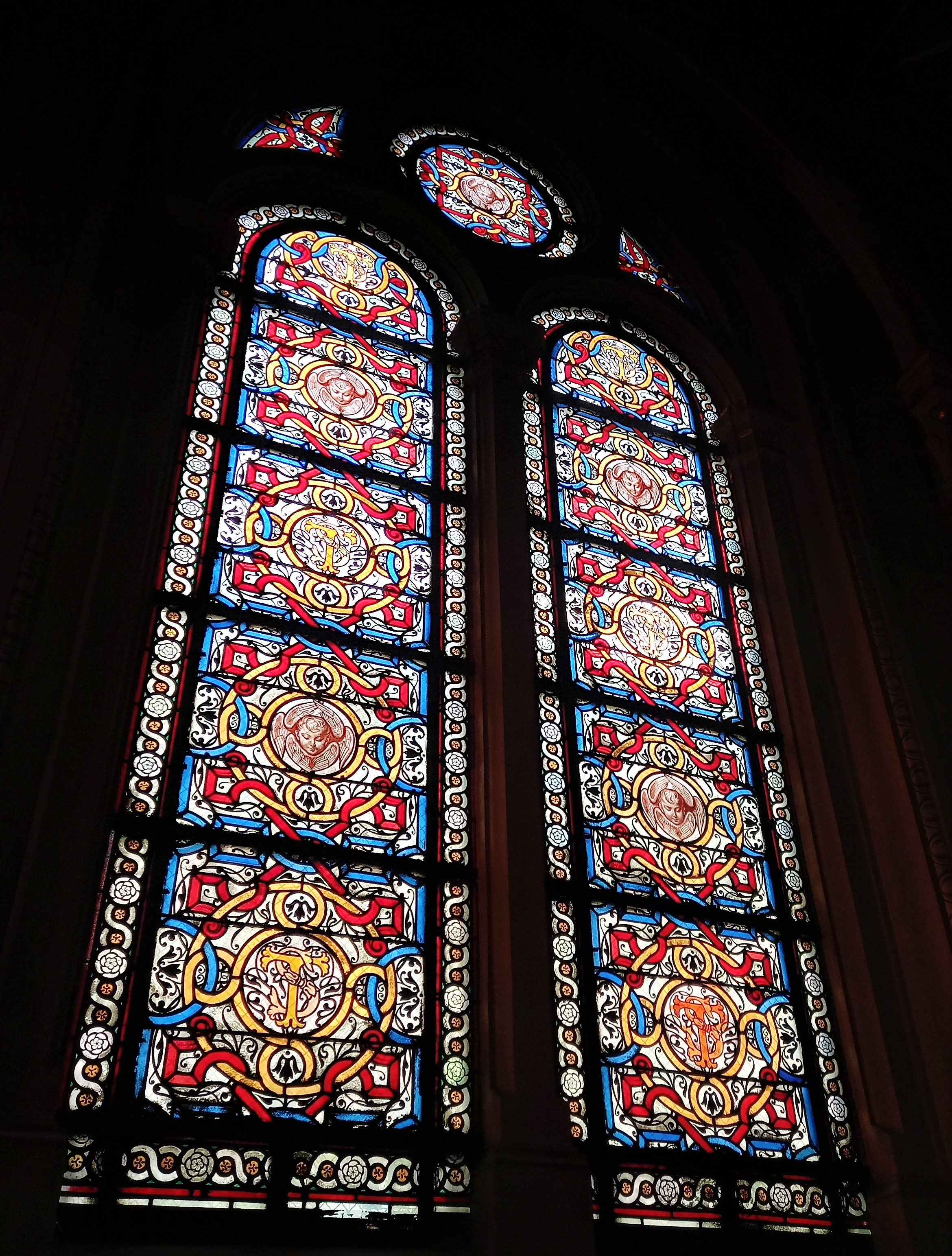
Abstract window by Paul Nicod

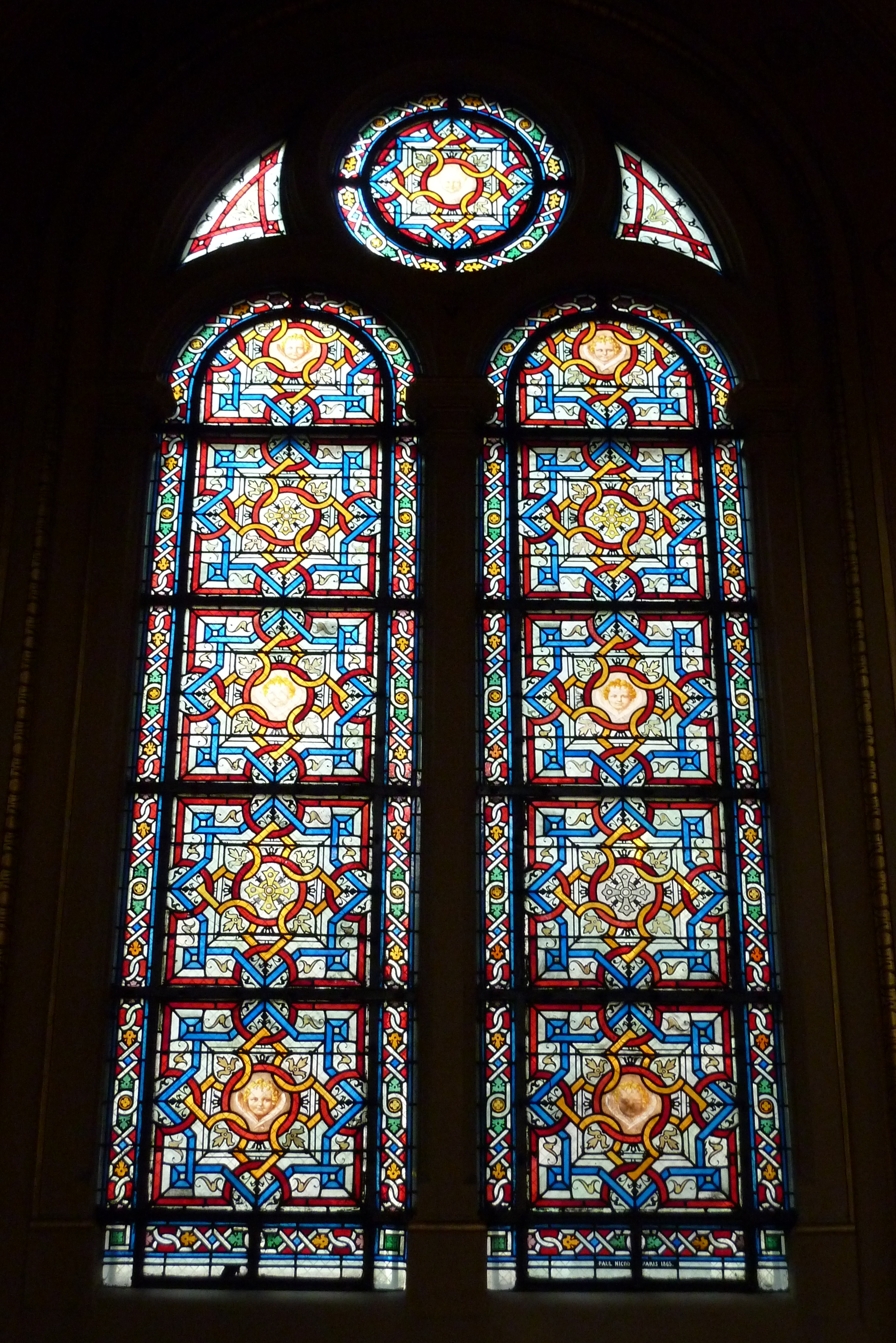
Abstract windows by Paul Nicod

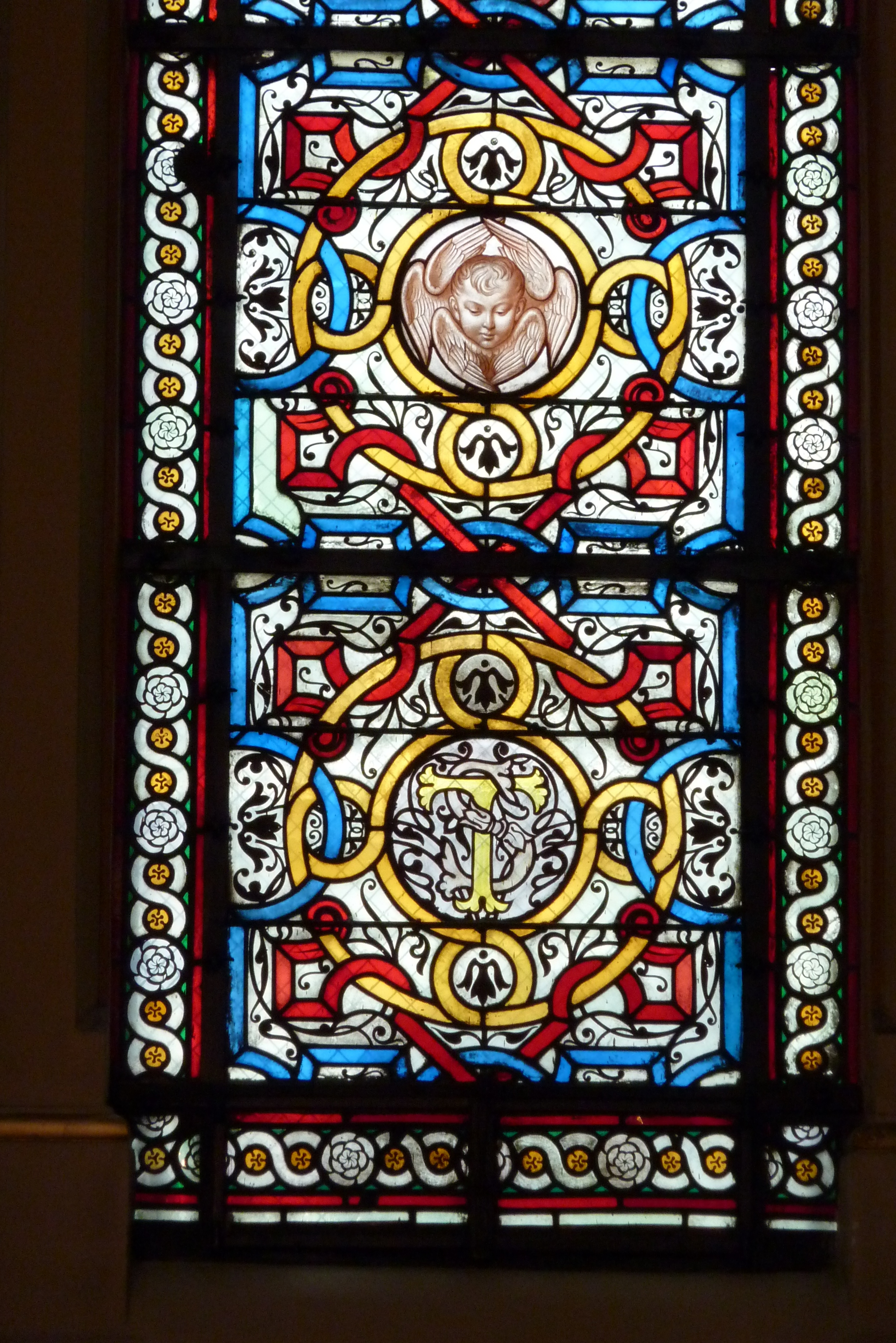
Detail from abstract window

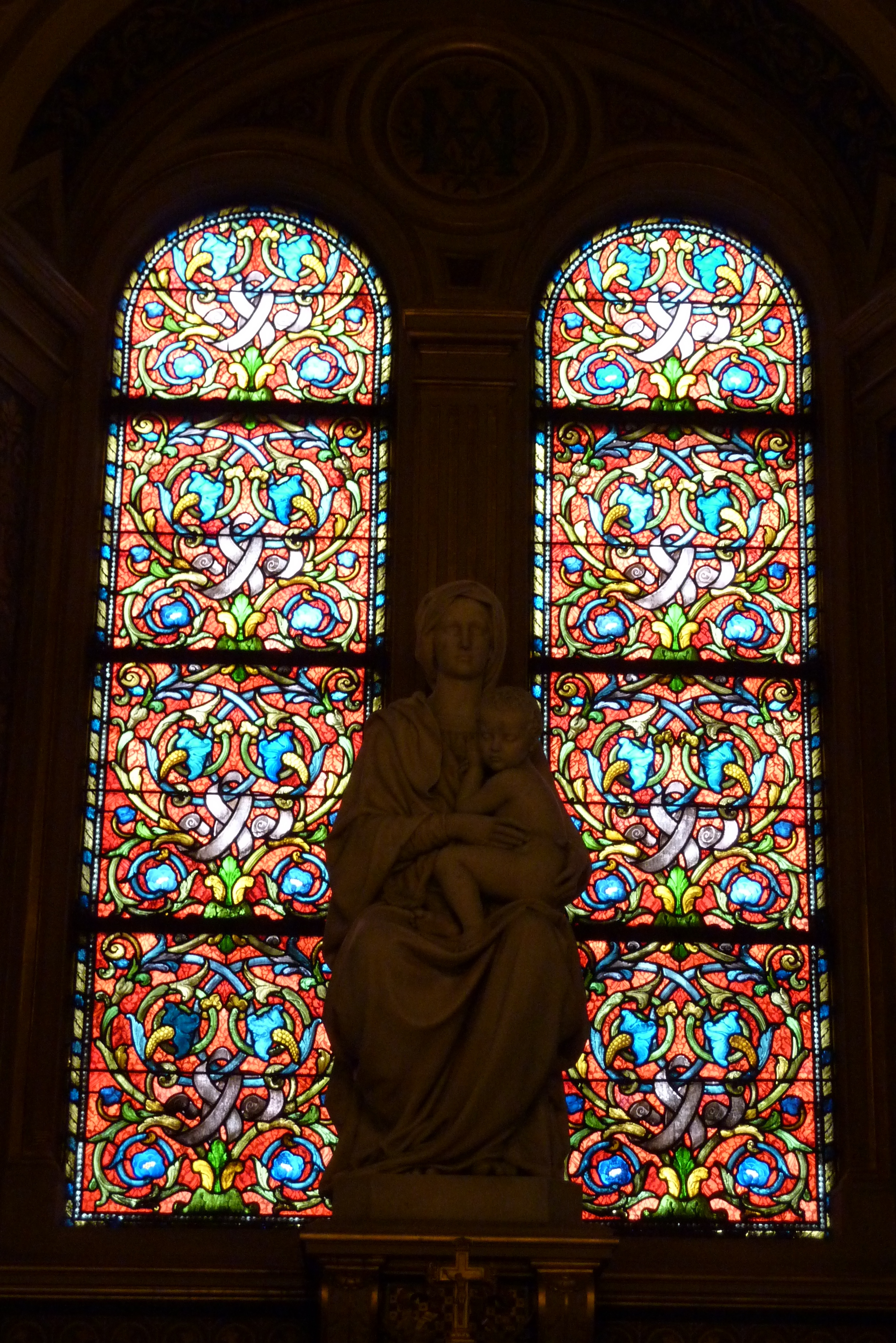
Abstract Lower central window in Chapel of the Virgin, by Paul Nicod

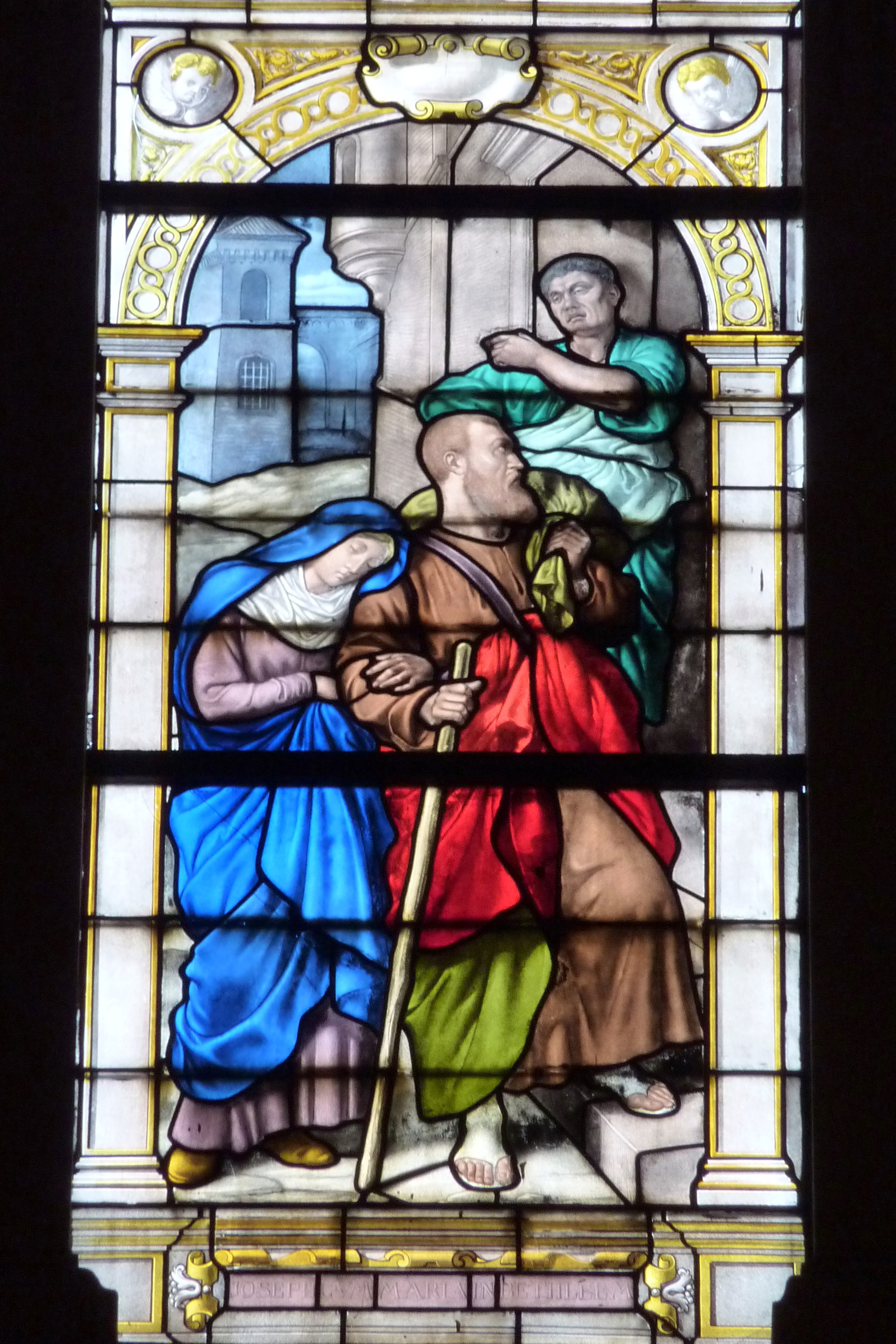
Scene from life of Virgin Mary, with Joseph in upper window of Chapel of Virgin

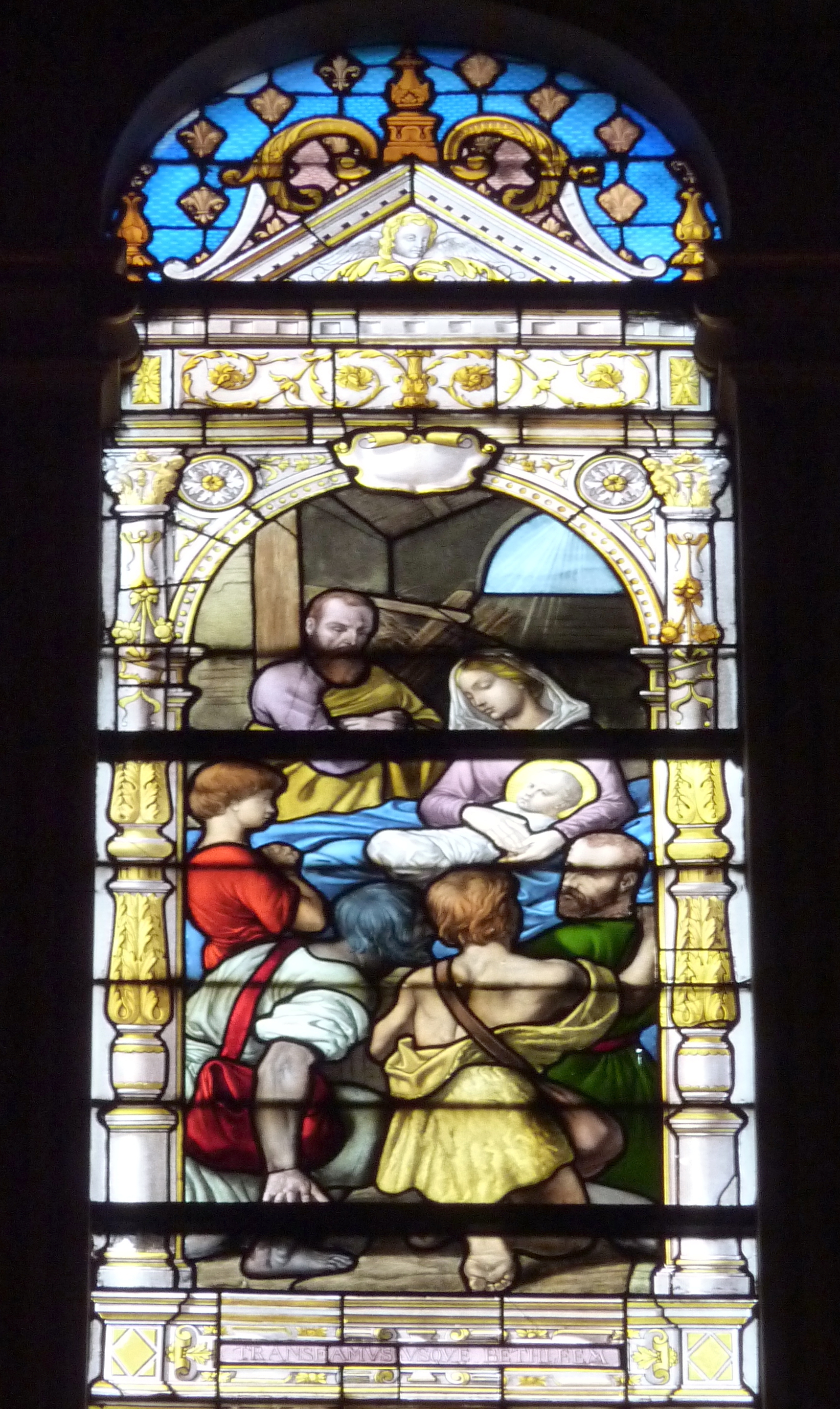
Scene from the life of the Virgin Mary, Chapel of Virgin

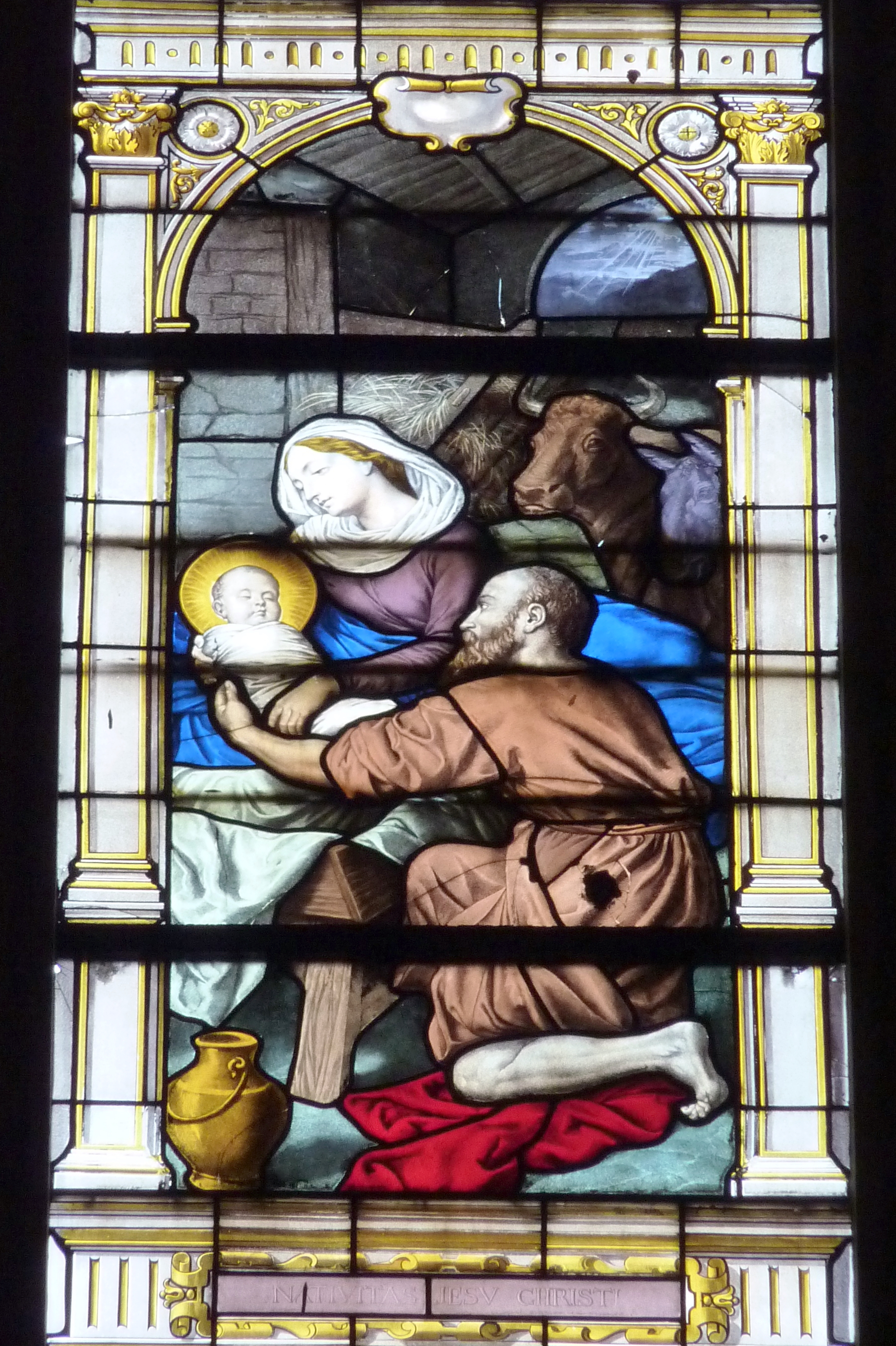
Virgin with Child, Chapel of Virgin

=== Decoration ===
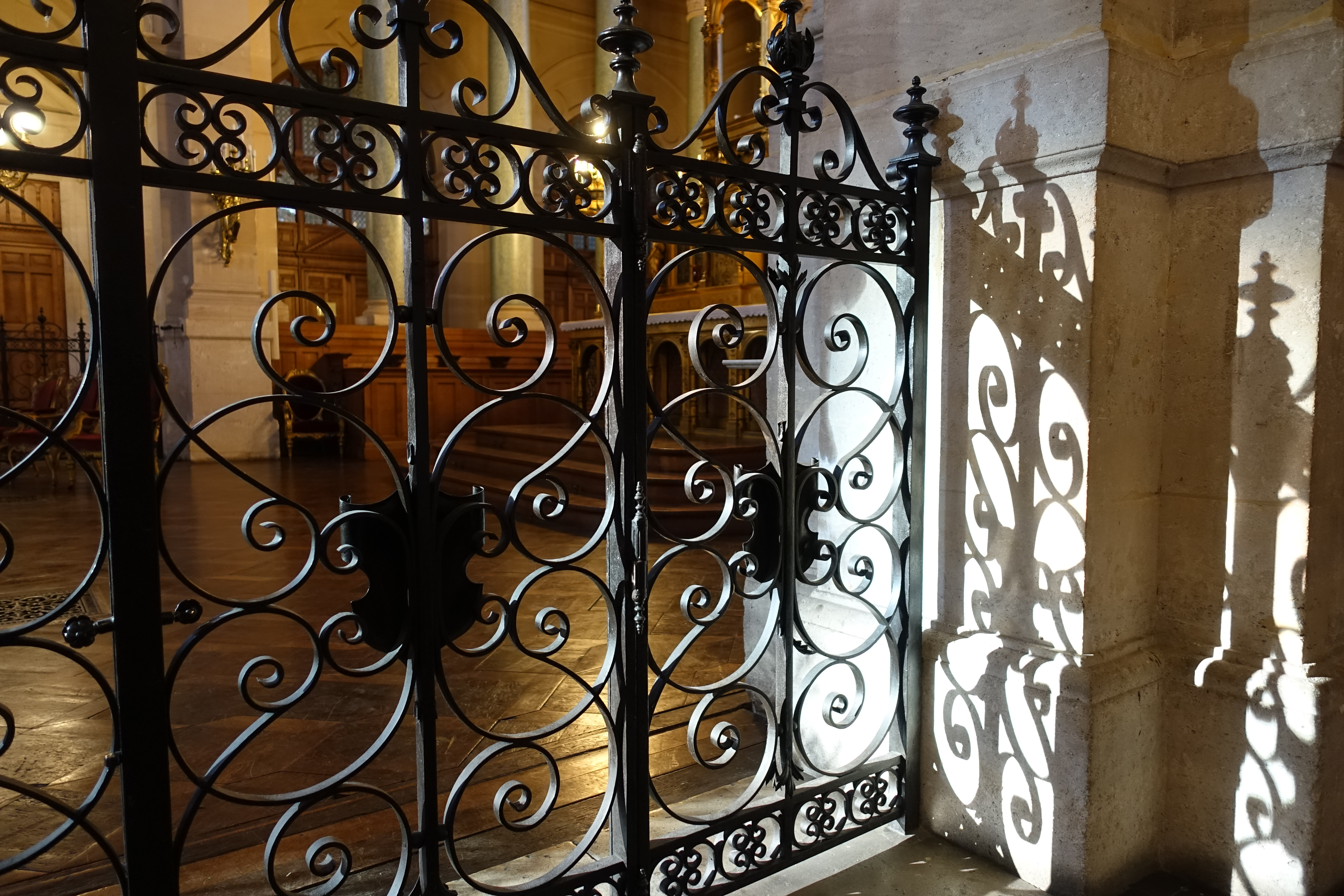
Wrought-iron grill

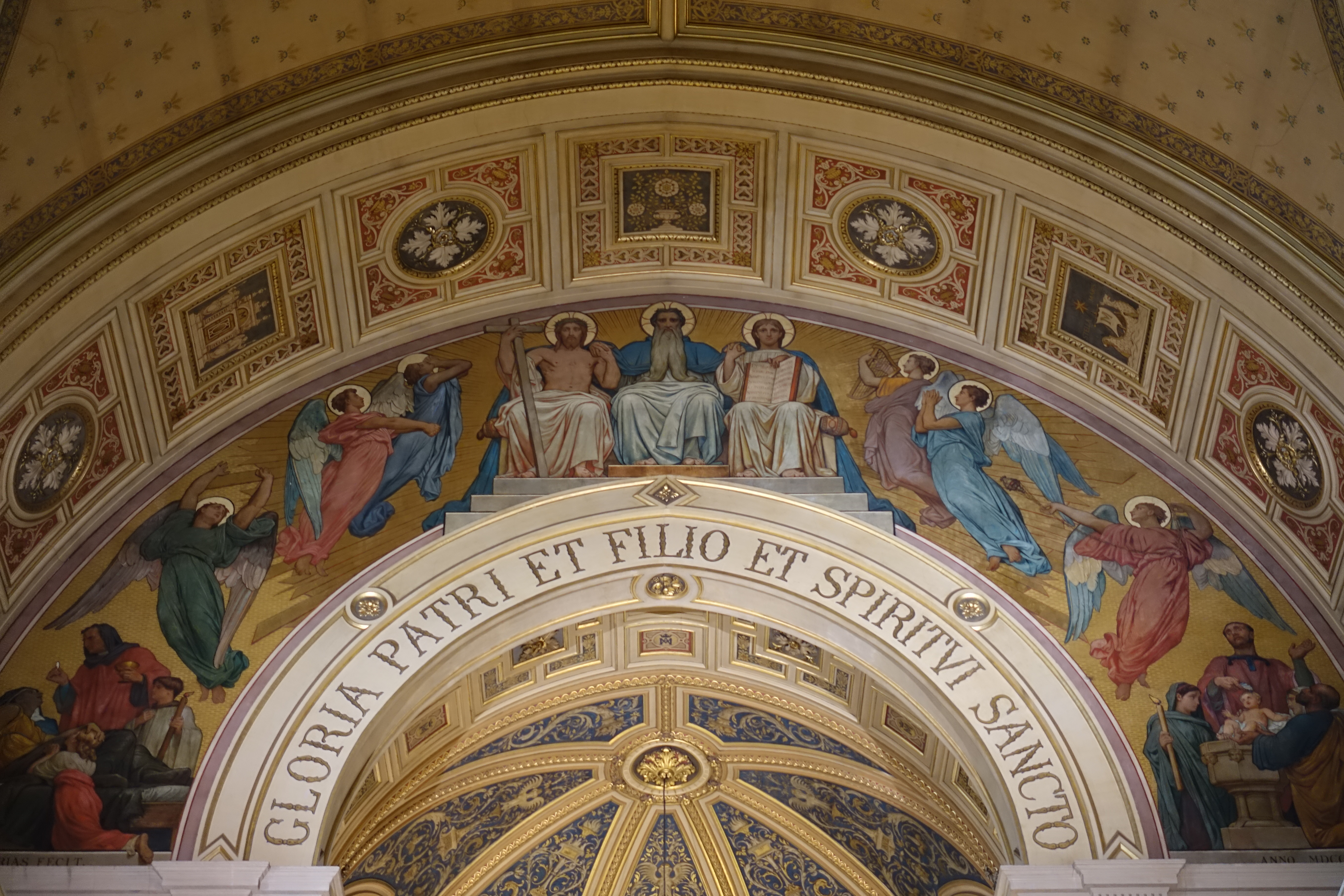
Mural over the choir, "The Holy Trinity" by Barrias (choir)

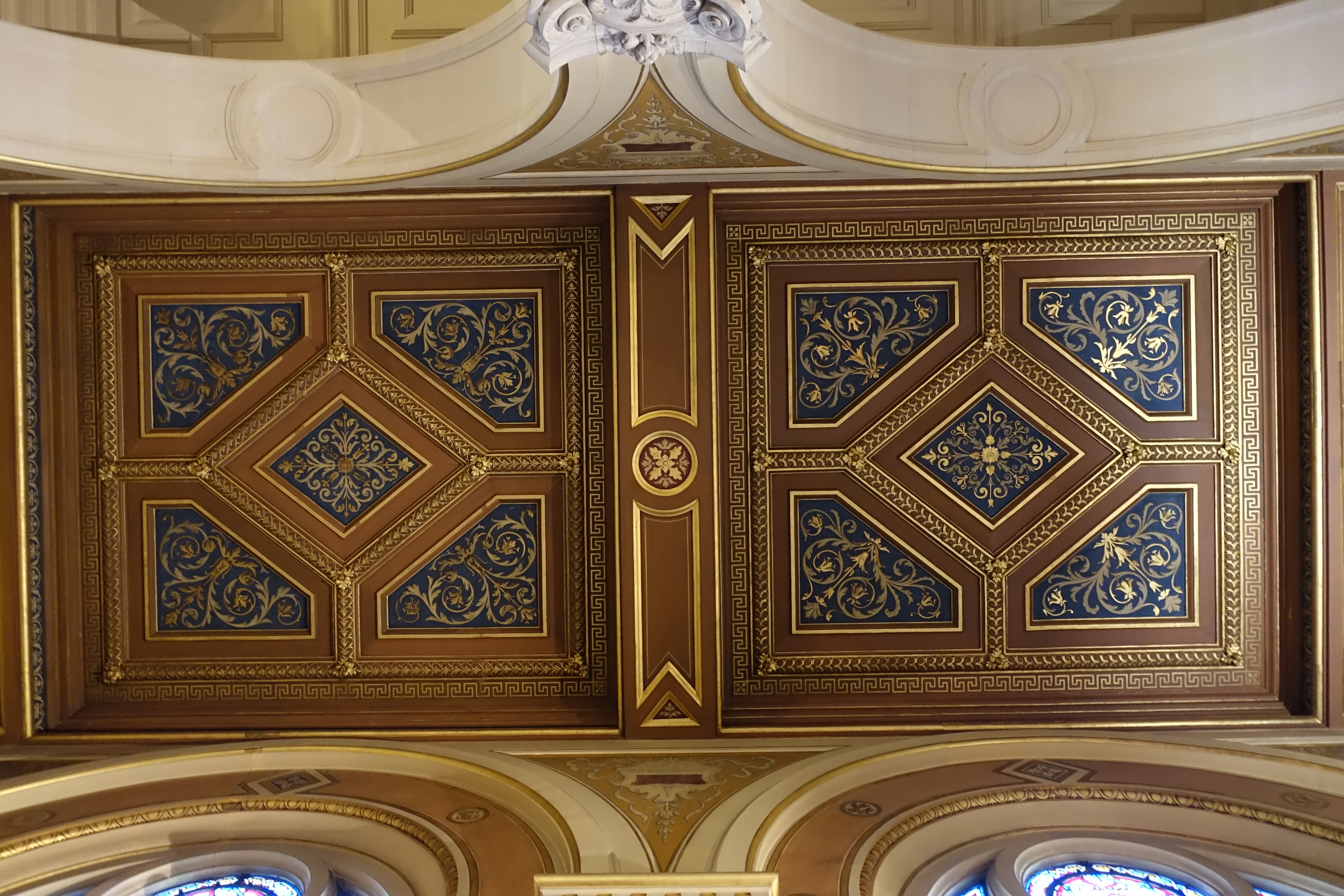
Ceiling decoration

== Organs ==
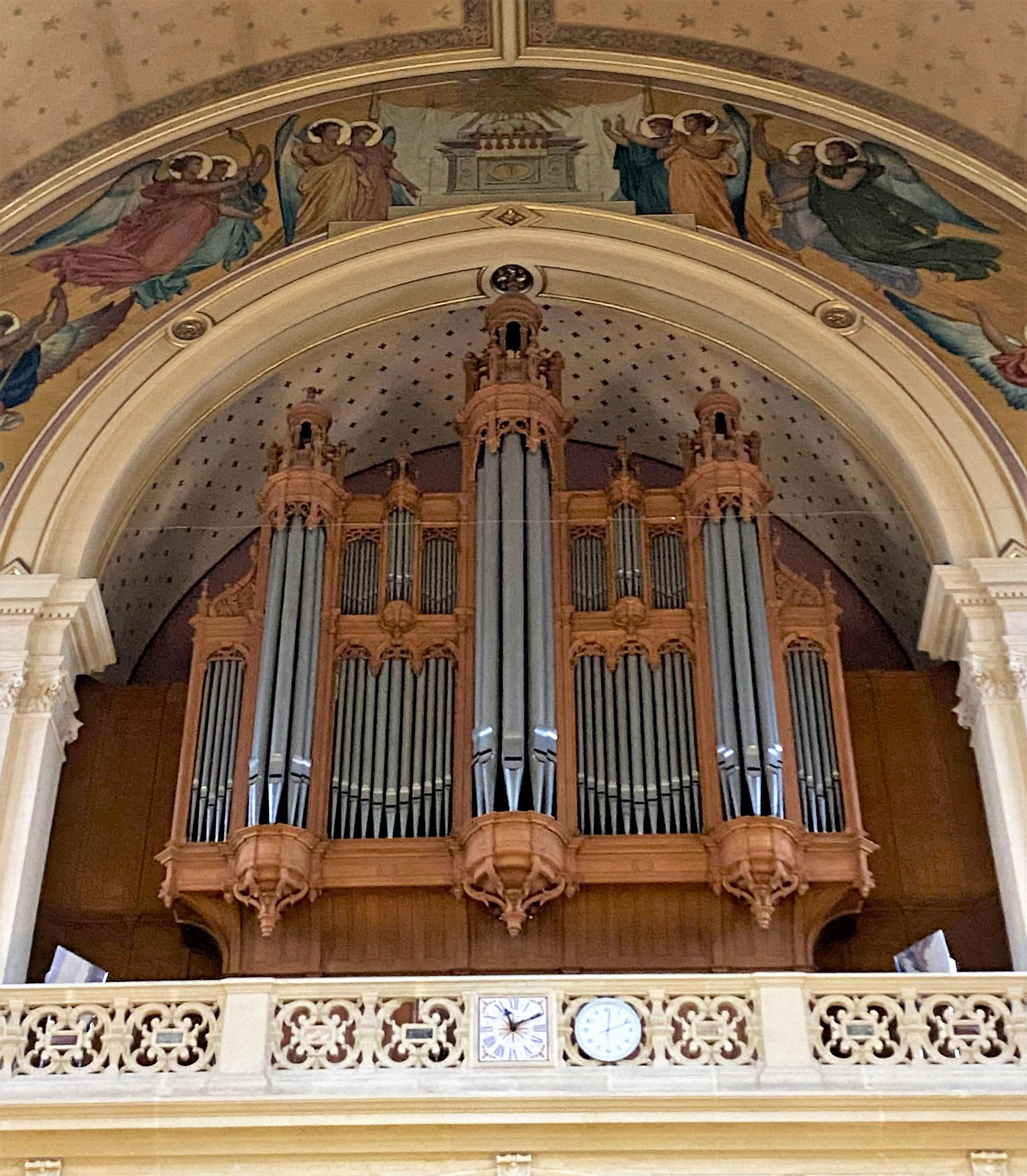
The main organ on the tribune

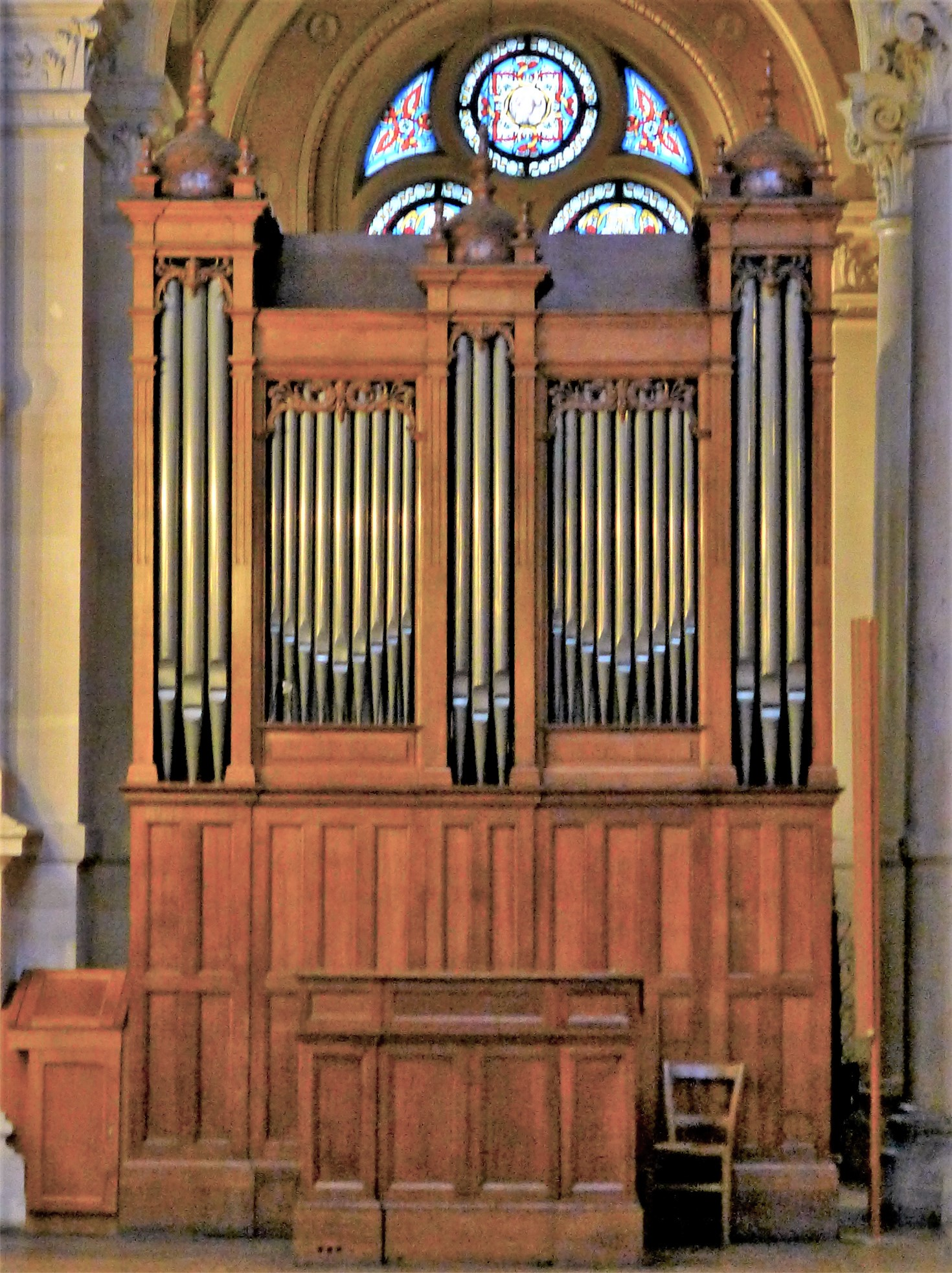
The choir organ

La Trinité features two organs, a Cavaillé-Coll chancel organ and a Cavaillé-Coll grand organ located in the balcony. The latter instrument has been extensively renovated and expanded over the decades:

- 1869 Original construction by the Cavaillé-Coll firm
- 1871 Reconstruction and repairs by the Cavaillé-Coll firm after damages incurred during the Paris Commune of 1870
- 1901 Rebuilding by Merklin
- 1934 Rebuilding by the Pleyel-Cavaillé-Coll firm
- 1962–65 Rebuilding by the Beuchet-Debierre firm

The current specifications of the grand organ are:

I Grand-Orgue C–g^{3}
Montre	16′
Bourdon	16′
Montre	8′
Flûte harmonique	8′
Bourdon	8′
Gambe	8′
Prestant	4′
Flûte octaviante	4′
Nazard	2 ^{2}/_{3}′
Doublette	2′
Cornet V
Plein Jeu IV
Cymbale II–IV
Bombarde	16′
Trompette	8′
Clairon	4′

II Positif C–g^{3}
Jeux sous expression:
Cor de nuit	8′
Flûte douce	4′
Nazard	2 ^{2}/_{3}′
Flageolet	2′
Tierce	1 ^{3}/_{5}′
Piccolo	1′
Clarinette	8′
Jeux non-expressifs:
Quintaton	16′
Principal	8′
Flûte harmonique	8′
Salicional	8′
Unda maris	8′
Prestant	4′
Doublette	2′
Cornet II–V
Fourniture IV
Basson	16′
Trompette	8′
Clairon	4′

III Récit (expressif) C–g^{3}
Bourdon	16′
Flûte traversière	8′
Bourdon	8′
Gambe	8′
Voix céleste	8′
Flûte octaviante	4′
Nazard	2 ^{2}/_{3}′
Octavin	2′
Tierce	1 ^{3}/_{5}′
Cymbale III
Bombarde	16′
Trompette	8′
Basson-Hautbois	8′
Voix humaine	8′
Clairon	4′
Tremblant

Pédale C–g^{1}
Flûte	32′
Soubasse	16′
Contrebasse	16′
Flûte	8′
Bourdon	8′
Violoncelle	8′
Flûte	4′
Plein Jeu IV
Bombarde	16′
Trompette	8′
Clairon	4′

== Organists ==
The French composer Olivier Messiaen (1908–1992) entered the Paris Conservatory at the age of eleven, and was appointed organist at the church in 1931, at the age of twenty-three. He held the post for 61 years until his death in 1992. During this period he wrote many of his most important works.

The titular organists at La Trinité include

- Charles-Alexis Chauvet (1869–1871)
- Alexandre Guilmant (1871–1901)
- Charles Quef (1901–1931)
- Olivier Messiaen (1931–1992)
- Naji Hakim (1993–2008)
- Maxime Patel (since 1999)
- Loïc Mallié (since 2011)

== Bibliography (in French) ==
- Dumoulin, Aline; Ardisson, Alexandra; Maingard, Jérôme; Antonello, Murielle; Églises de Paris (2010), Éditions Massin, Issy-Les-Moulineaux, ISBN 978-2-7072-0683-1 (in French)

== See also ==
- List of historic churches in Paris
