= Saint-Ambroise, Paris =

Church of Saint-Ambroise
- Église Saint-Ambroise
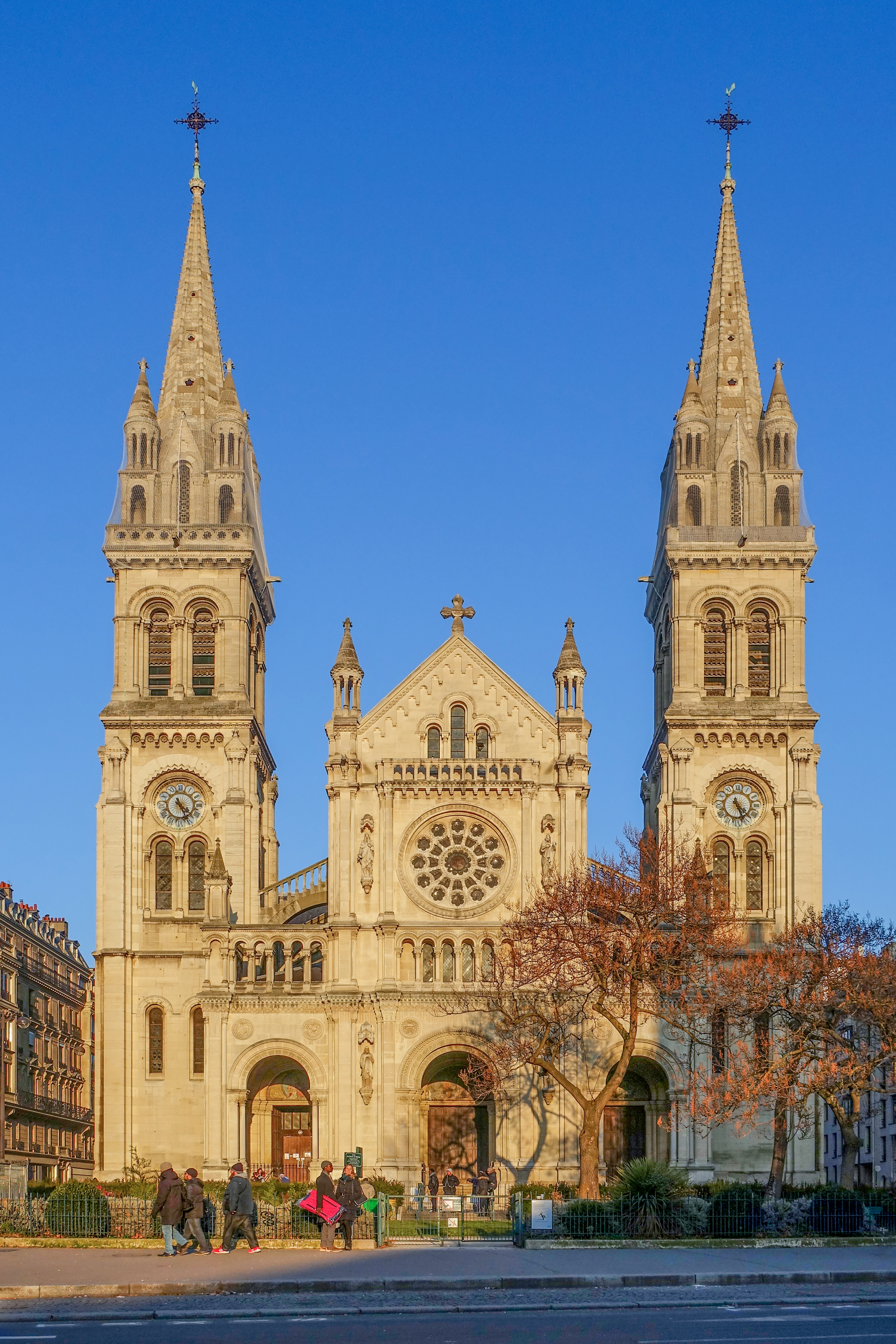
- Church of Saint-Ambroise
- 48°51′39.84″N 2°22′32.03″E
- Location: 11th arrondissement of Paris
- Country: France
- Denomination: Roman Catholic Church

Saint-Ambroise (French pronunciation: [sɛ̃.t‿ɑ̃.bʁwaz]) is a Roman Catholic parish church located in the 11th arrondissement in eastern Paris. It is dedicated to St. Ambrose (339-377), an ancient Roman statesman and theologian who served as Bishop of Milan.

The church of Saint-Ambroise gave the neighborhood its name, the quartier Saint-Ambroise. The current structure replaced an earlier church of Saint-Ambroise, built in 1659, which was demolished to make room for the new boulevards built by Napoleon III. The church is 87 metres in length, and its towers are 68 metres high. It is served by the Metro station Saint-Ambroise.

The church was inscribed as a French national historic monument on 2 June, 1978.

== History ==
=== First church ===
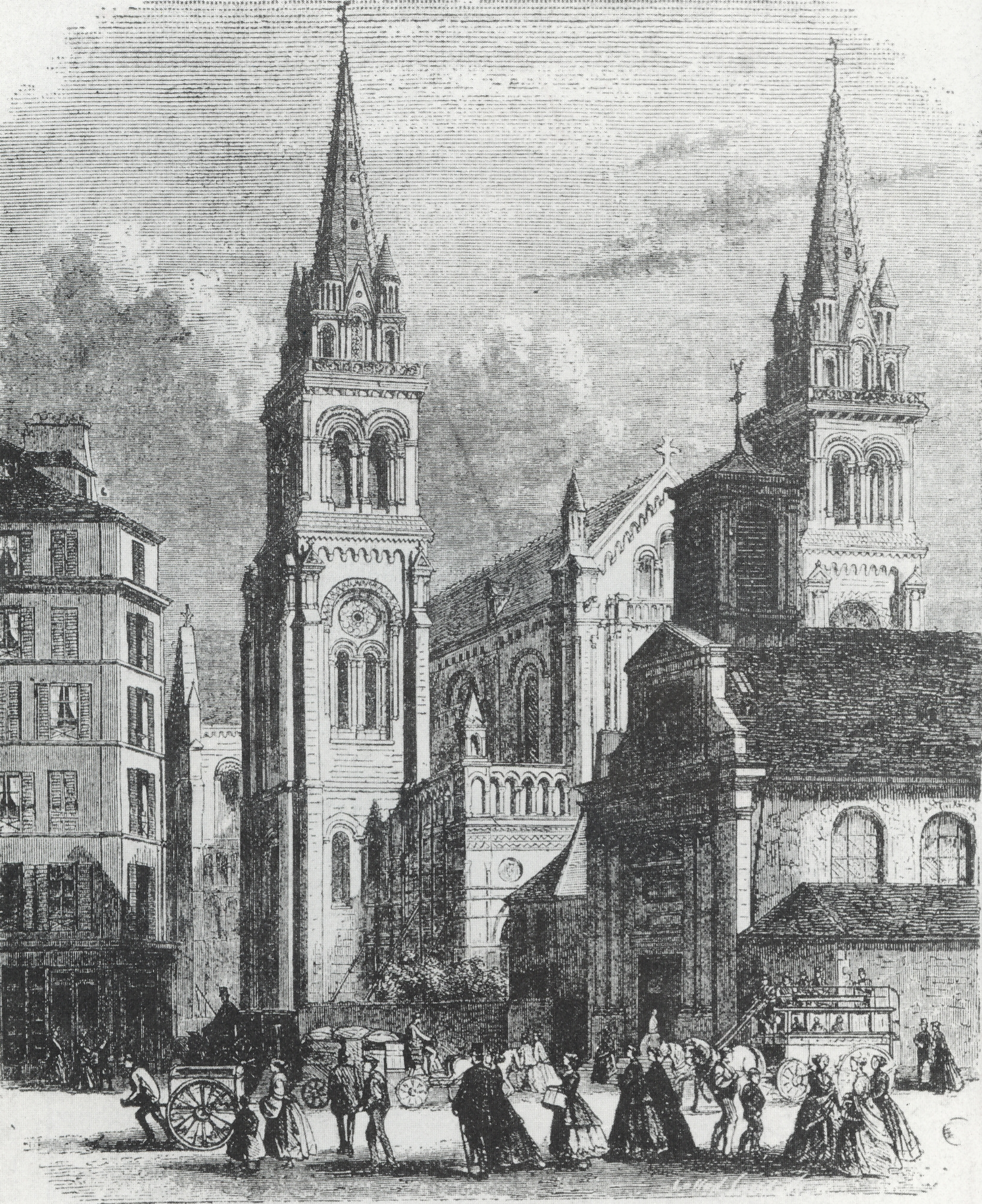
The first church in 1868 (foreground right) and the present church (background)

The first chapel on the site was constructed in 1659 by the religious order of the Convent of the Annonciades de Popincourt, which had first occupied the site on Rue Popincourt in 1636. They left their convent in 1782, and two new streets were opened at the site in 1783, rue Saint-Ambroise and rue de Beauharnais.

In 1797, during the French Revolution, the church was closed and declared a national property, and was sold, but not demolished. In 1802 it was attached to the Parish of Saint Maguerite. In August 1811 it was purchased by the City of Paris, which launched a program of restoration and enlargement under the direction of Etienne-Hippolyte Godde.

The church was renamed Notre-Dame de la Procession. Unlike the traditional east–west orientation of churches, it was oriented north-south to fit into neighboring streets. The church was formally blessed on 15 November 1818.

=== Second church ===
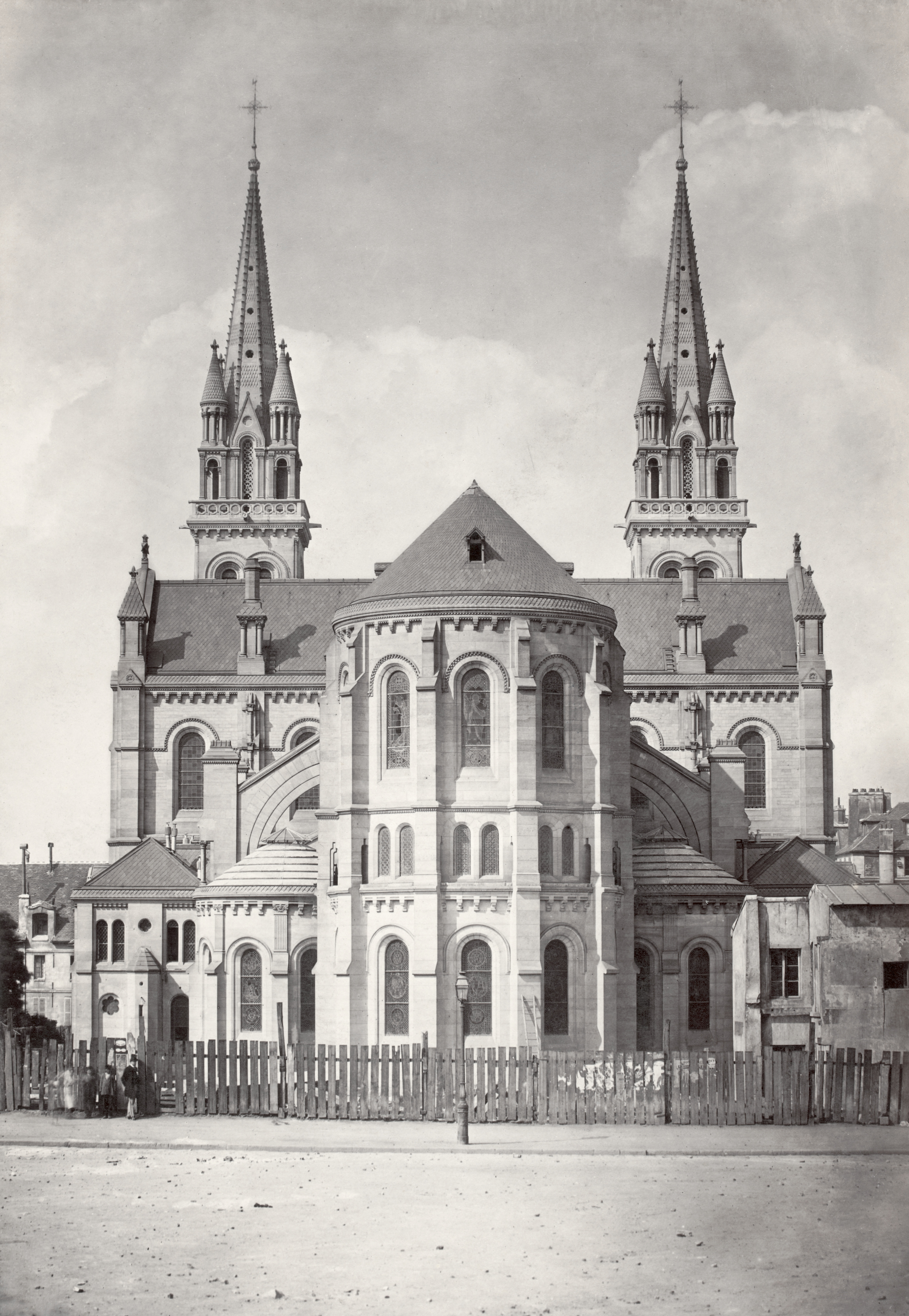
The new church, photographed by Charles Marville (1868-70)

The old church was demolished during the rebuilding carried it in the canter of Paris by Napoléon III and Baron Haussmann. It was torn down to make room for the new Boulevard Prince Eugene (now Boulevard Voltaire). A site nearby was offered for a new church at the head of the future Boulevard at the head of the new Boulevard. The new church was and work began in 1863 on new church at the head of the new Boulevard Voltaire.

The new church was designed by the architect Théodore Ballu. who was designated by Napoléon III as the official city architect for religious buildings. His churches included the Église de la Trinité (1861–1867), the Saint-Esprit Temple on Rue Roquépine, and the Church of Saint-Joseph (1866–1875). He also directed the Saint-Jacques Tower restoration (1854–1858)[1] and the construction of the Saint-Denis church in Argenteuil (1866).

L’Eglise de la Trinité was built between 1863 and 1868. The first mass was celebrated on 21 March 1869. The construction lasted six years and officially cost 2,217,534 francs and fifty-eight centimes. The bells were blessed on 29 April 1869 in the presence of the Empress Eugénie, who was also the patroness of one of the bells.

=== Notable events ===
During the Paris Commune the church was briefly transformed into a meeting hall for the Proletarian Club, where speakers advocated socialism and feminism. It was also used storage depot for munitions.

On 18 March 1996 the church was occupied by about three hundred African immigrants who demanded regularization of their immigration status. After four days, and concerns about sanitary conditions, the group was ordered to leave by public authorities. When the occupants refused to leave, early in the morning the church was cleared by the police. The same group shortly afterwards briefly occupied another neighbourhood church, église Saint-Bernard.

== Exterior ==
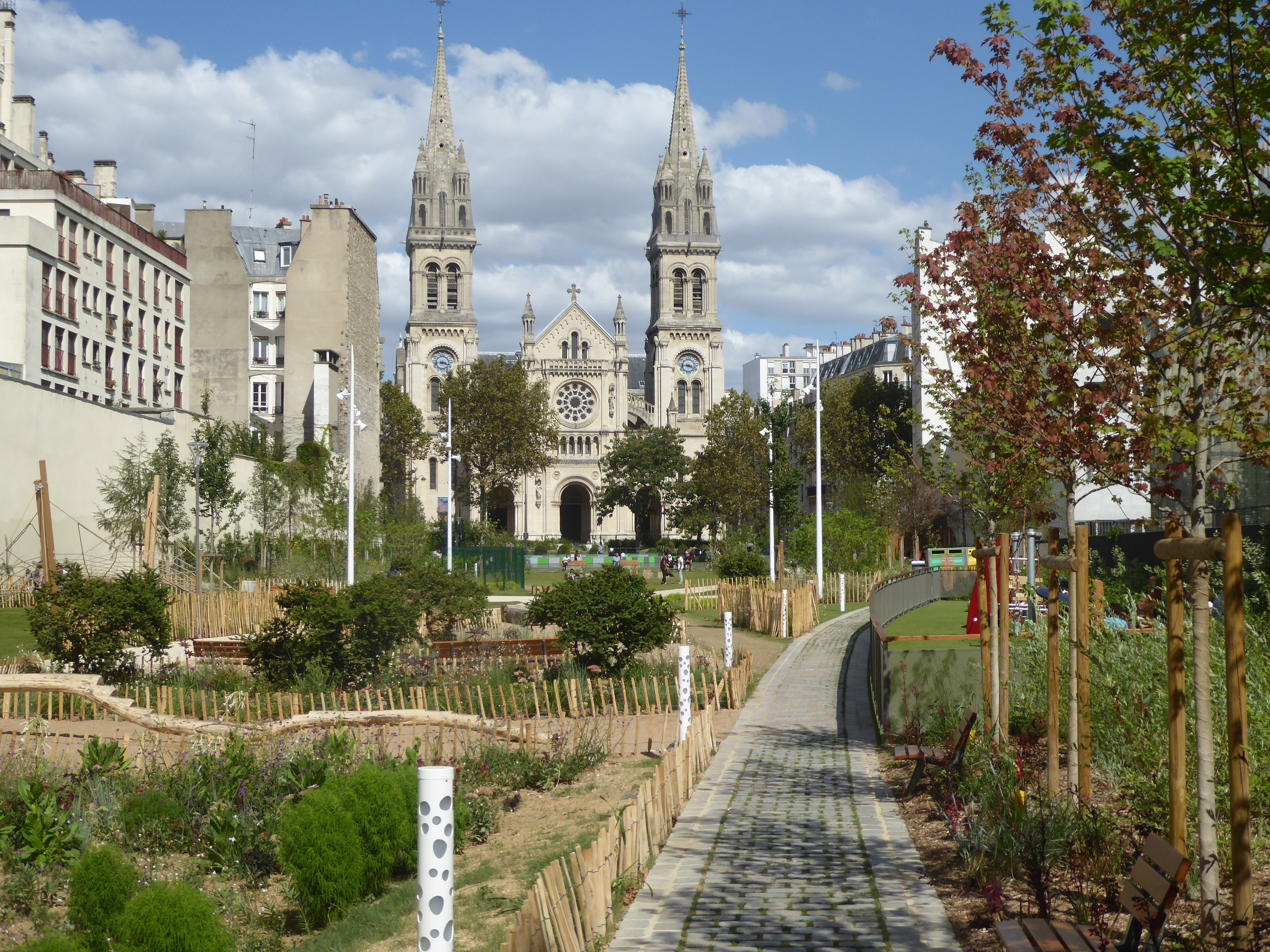
The southwest facade seen from the Jardin Truillot

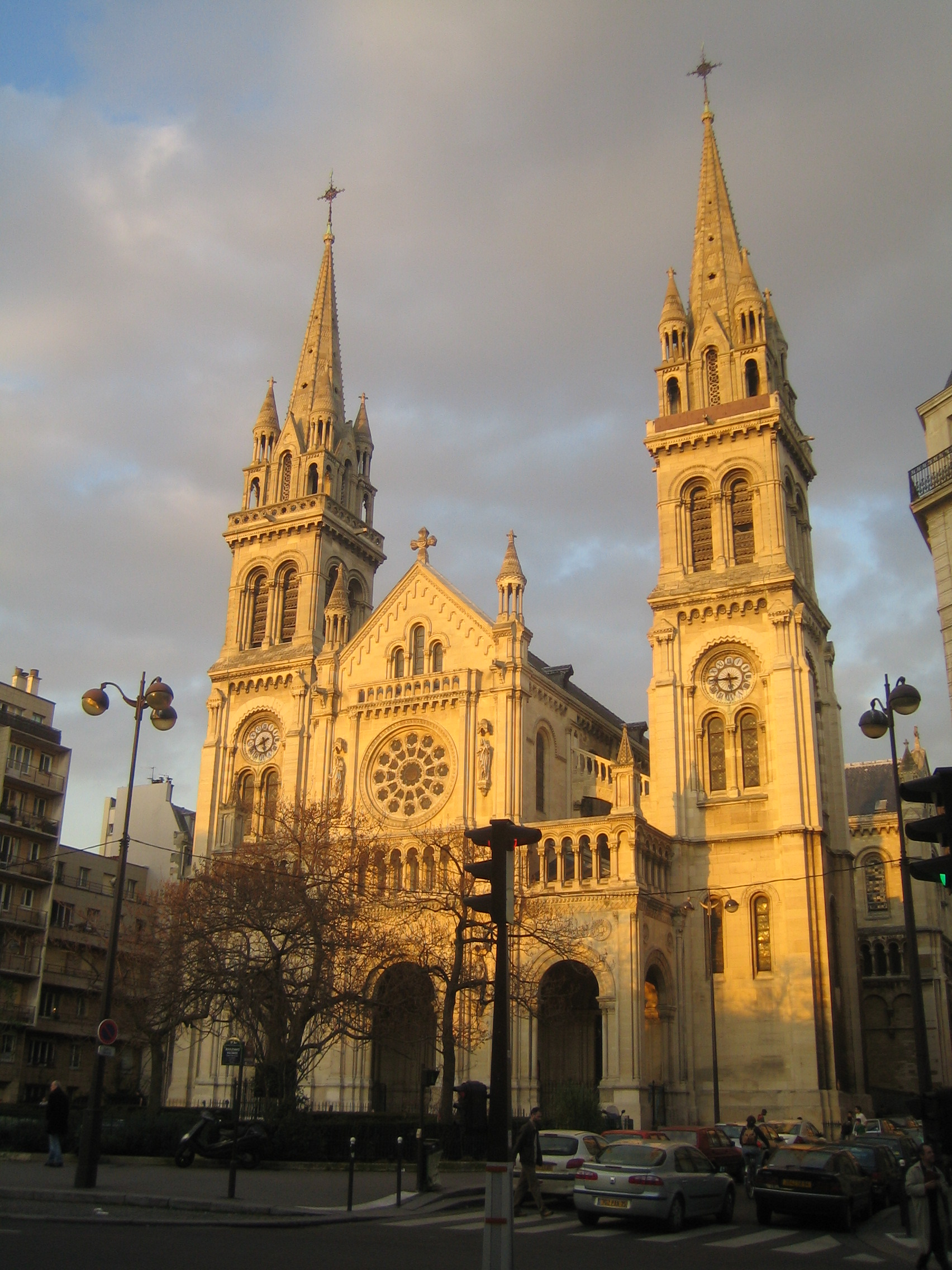
The church at sunset

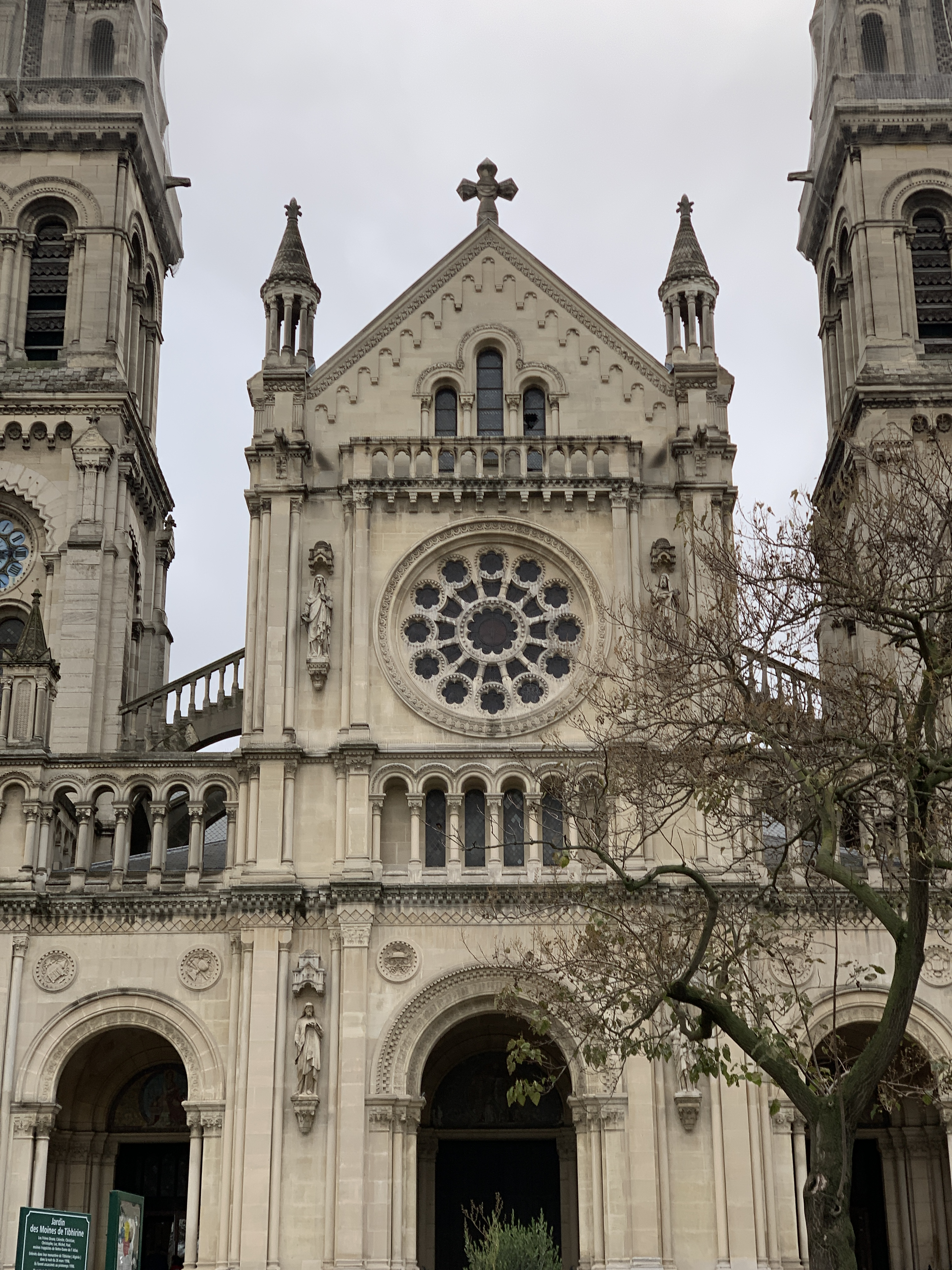
the porch and facade

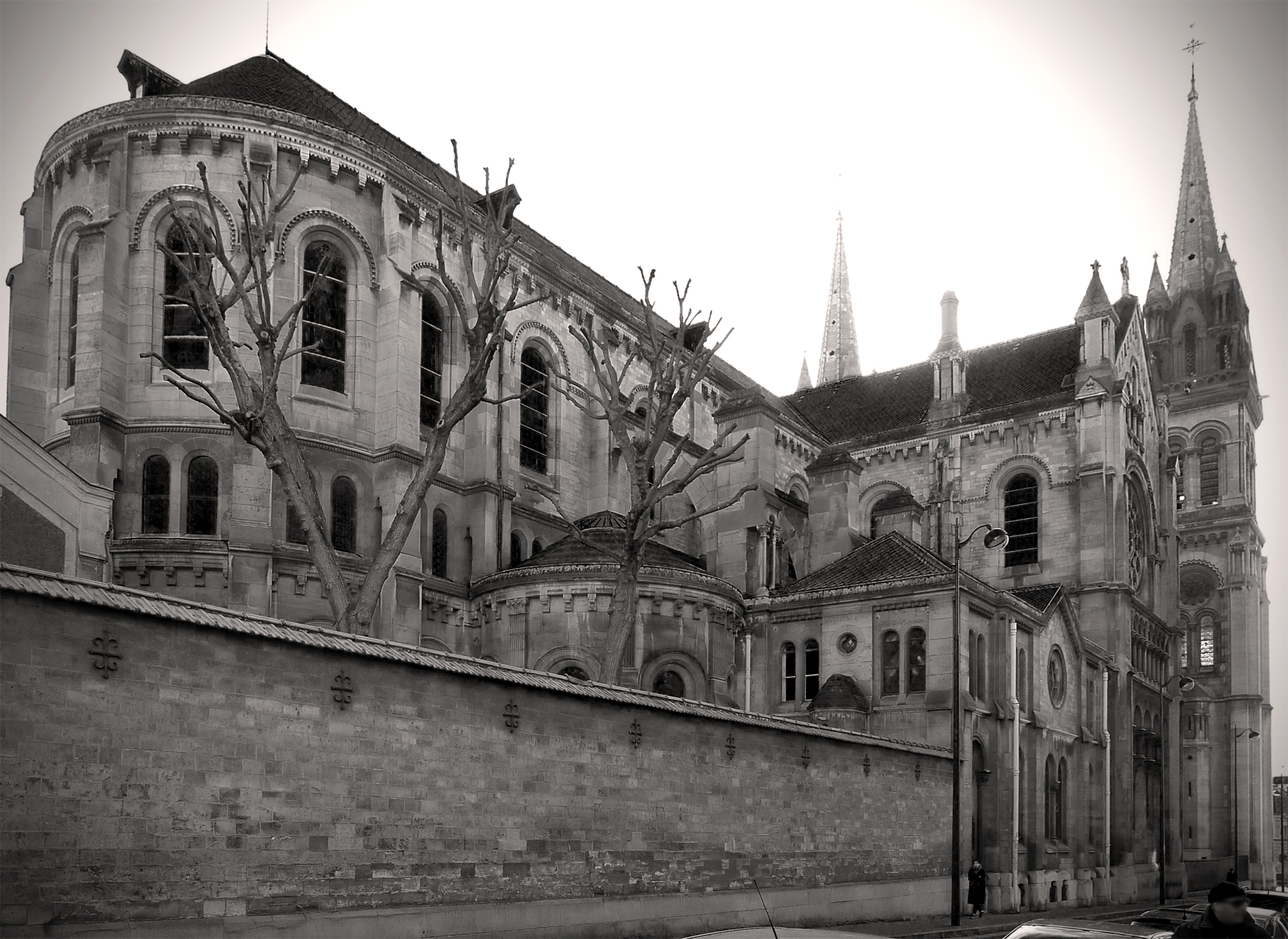
The Chevet, or end of the nave

The church was built in an eclectic style, sometimes termed Second Empire style, which combined Neo-Romanesque elements with those of the Neo-Gothic style. A similar example of the style is the Abbey of Saint-Etienne, Caen, which joined two Romanesque-style towers with Gothic spires.

The church is 87 meters in length and 37 meters wide at the transept, and has two identical bell towers, each 68 meters high, close to the height of the towers of Notre Dame de Paris. The spires are octagonal, and are flanked by four pinacles and topped by two crosses of iron, and by a small form of a rooster, the symbol of the French State, which indicates the highest point of the building and is also the symbol of the French State, the owner of the Cathedral. The church is built with the hard stone of the Yonne and Meuse region for the foundations, the towers and the pillars, and the stone from the quarries of Saint-Maximin for the other elements.

The porch has three doorways. The tympanum of each doorway is decorated with a painting made with vitreous enamel or porcelain enamel, an ancient Byzantine technique, These were painted by Giuseppe Devers (1823-1882). They represent allegorical figures of eloquence and theology, and a figure of Saint Ambroise.

In front of the church there is a small public garden, the Jardin Truillot, which includes a sculpture honoring sixty years of Catholic Aid, donated by local residents and sculpted by G. Chance.

== Interior ==
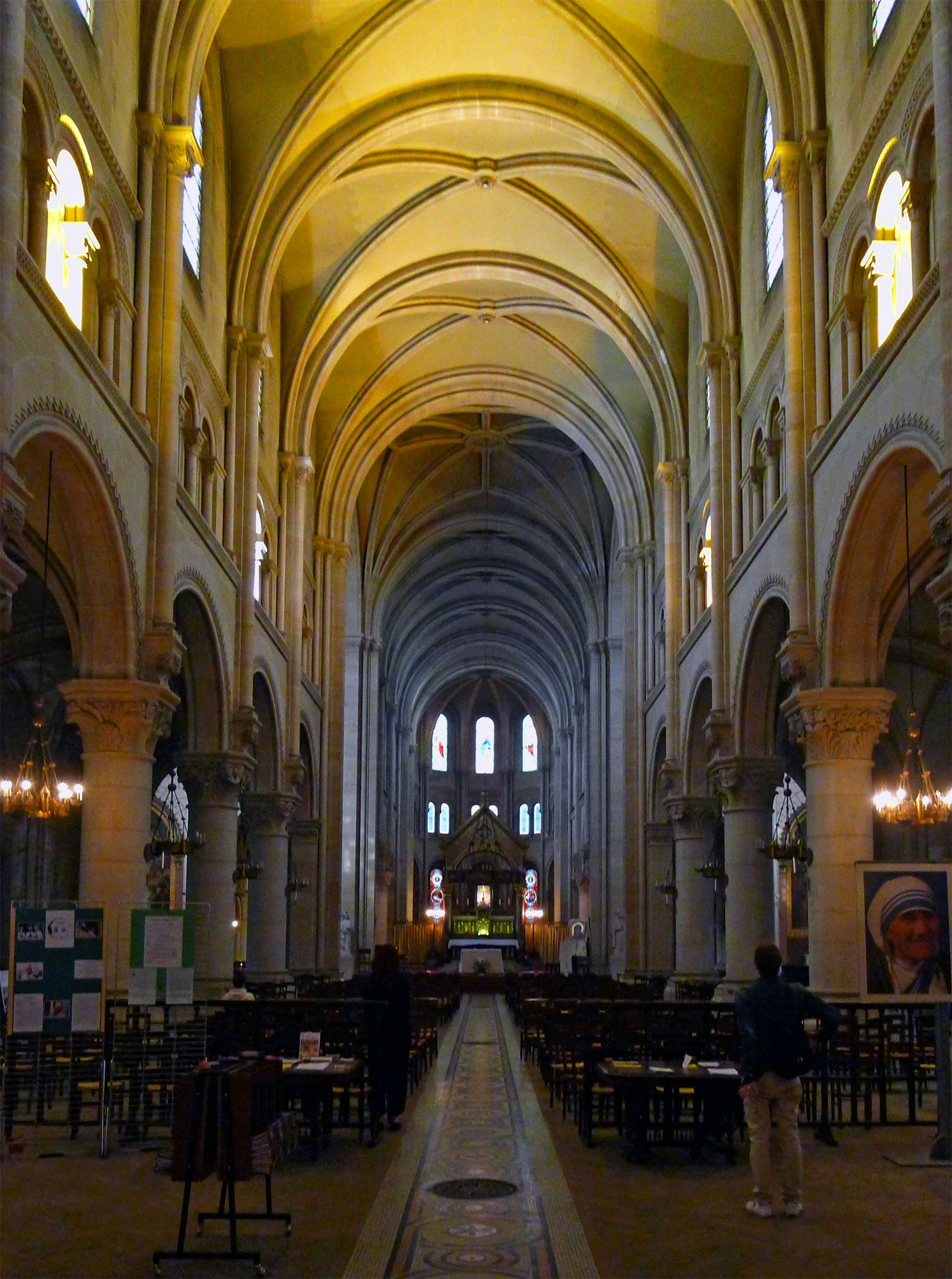
The nave, looking toward the altar

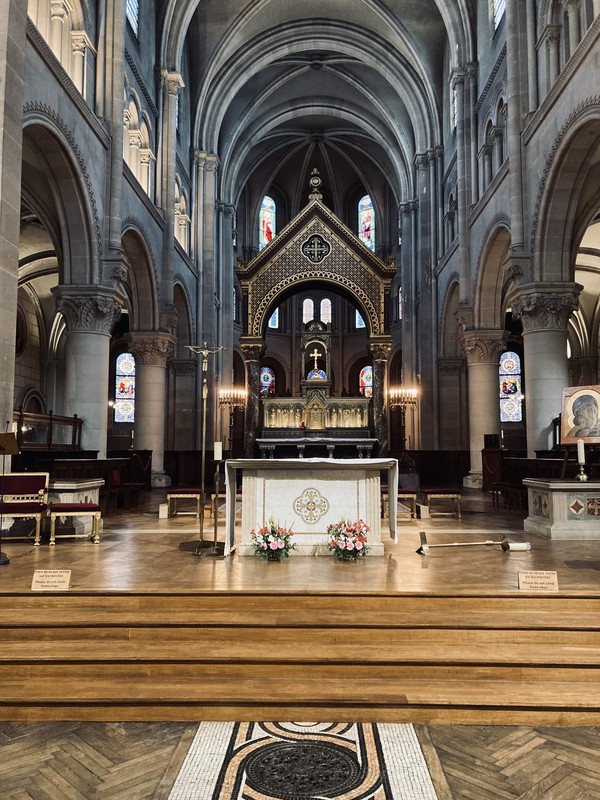
The altar

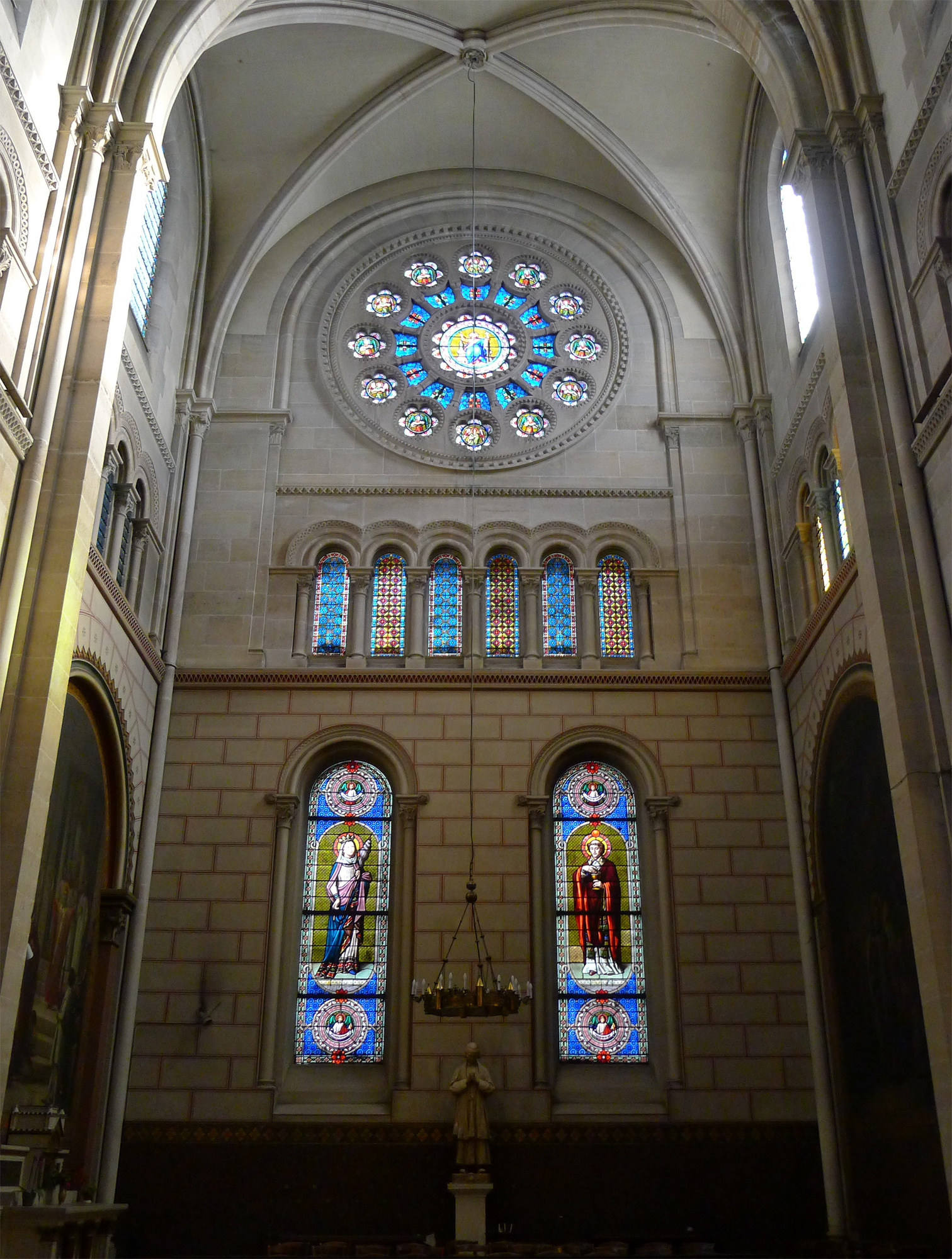
The transept

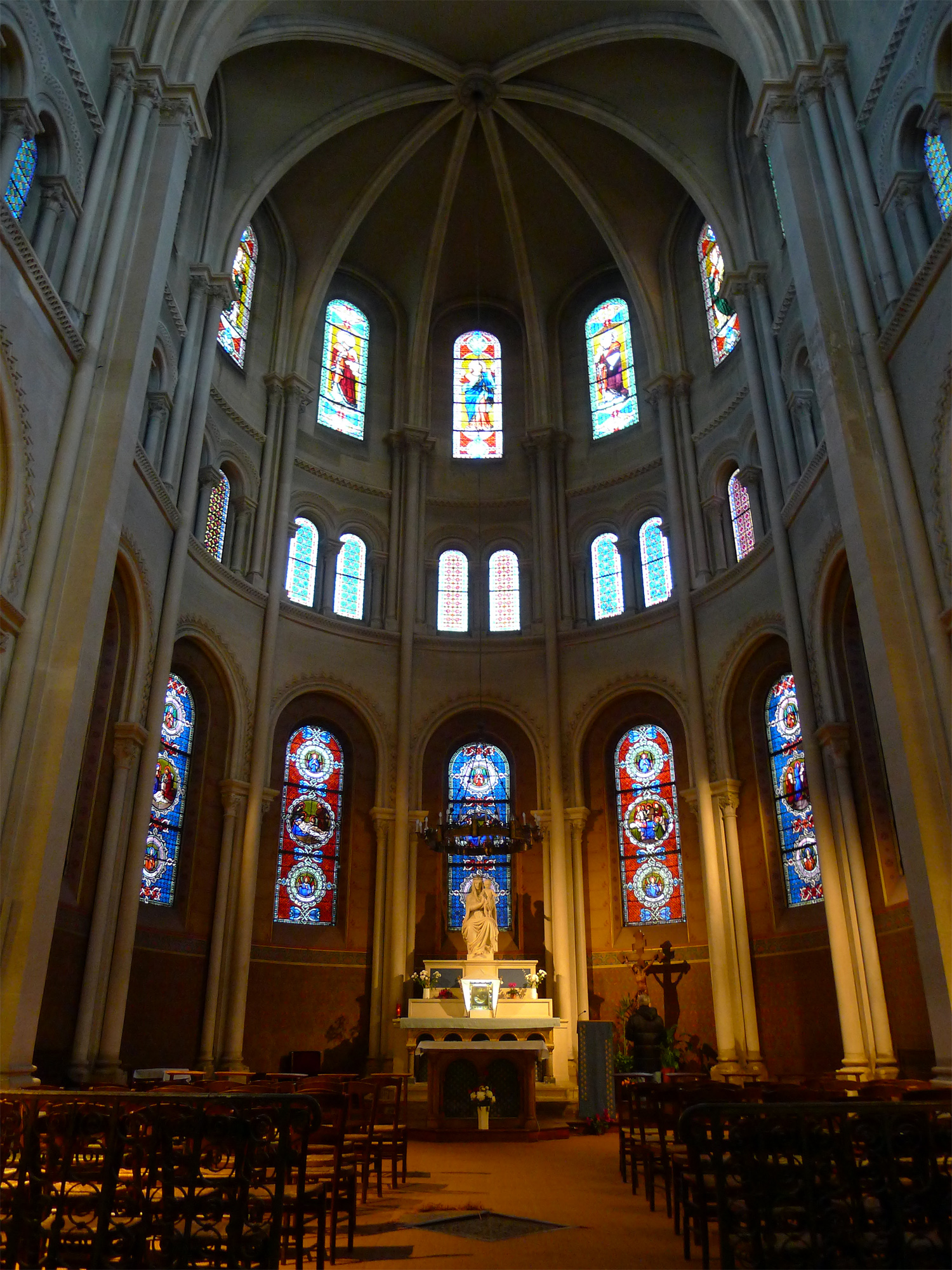
Chapel of the Virgin

The nave of the church is 87 meters long and twenty meters high. The architecture is largely Romanesque, with large cylindrical pillars topped with floral capitals, which support the arcades and an interior gallery, or triforium.

== Art and Decoration ==
The art and decoration in the church is not lavish; the agreement for French-government financing of the cathedral by Napoleon III put a limit on spending for art. Despite this, the church exterior and interior contain a variety of sculptures and paintings, as well as stained glass.

The facade is decorated with two large statues; "The Prophet Jeremiah" by F. Taluet and "The Prophet Ezekiel" by J. Cambos.

=== Stained glass ===
The stained glass in the church was made between 1866 and 1869 by the workshop of Charles-Raphael Marechal. The transept, where the nave meets the choir, is decorated with stained glass windows, as are the chapels. Many of the windows are simply decorated with geometric designs, bringing in more light,

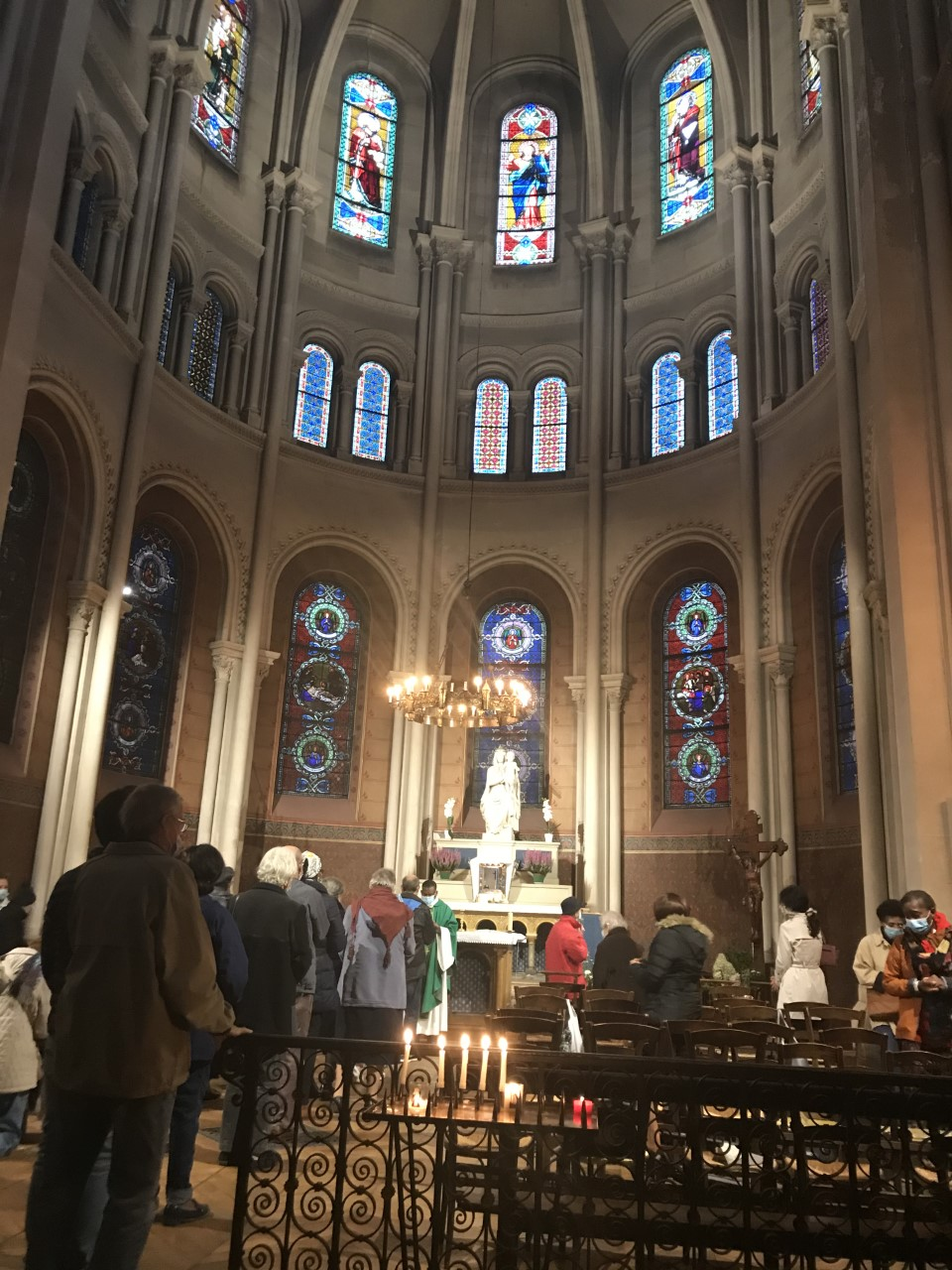
The Chapel of the Holy Virgin

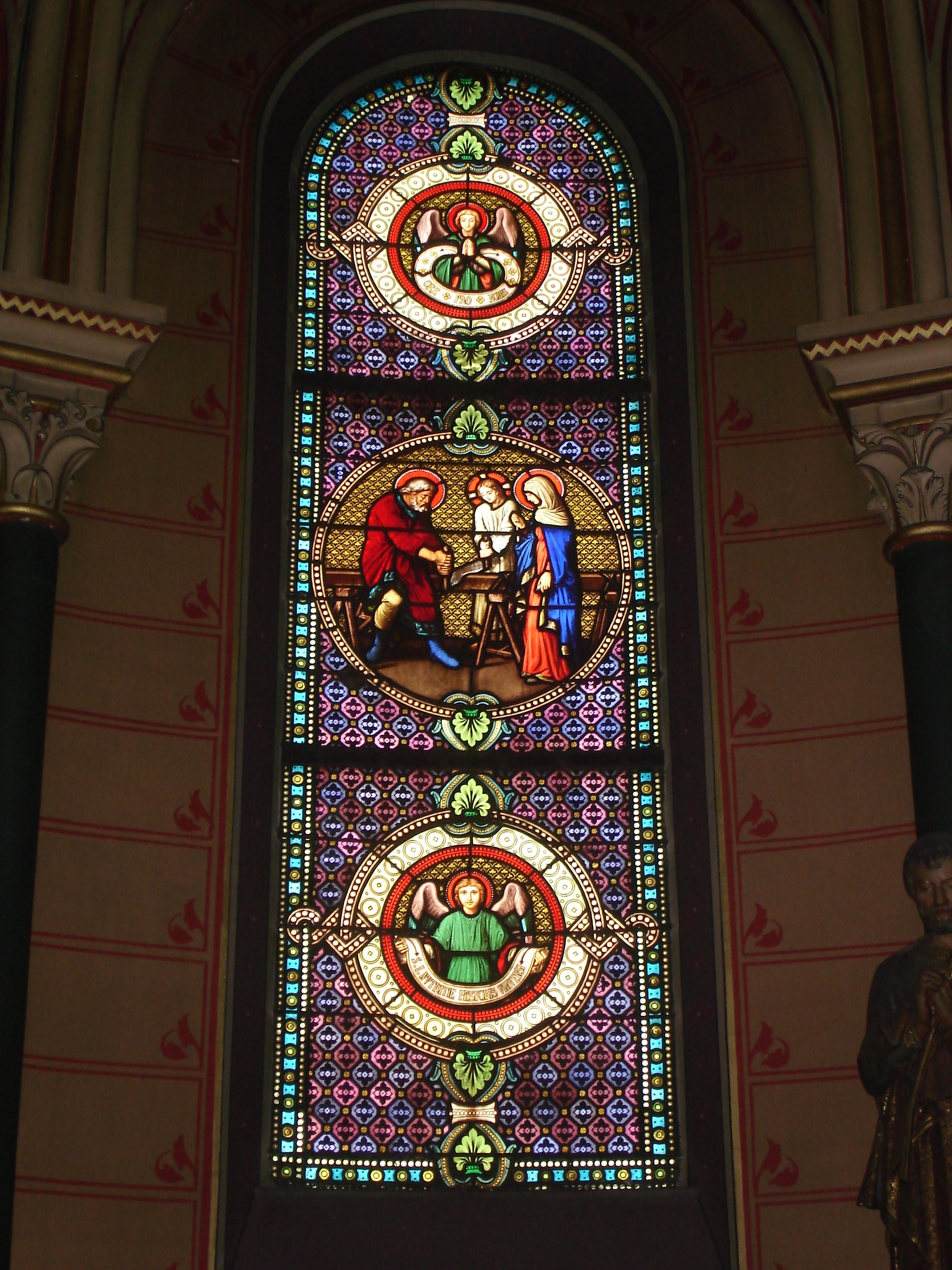
"Joseph the Carpenter"

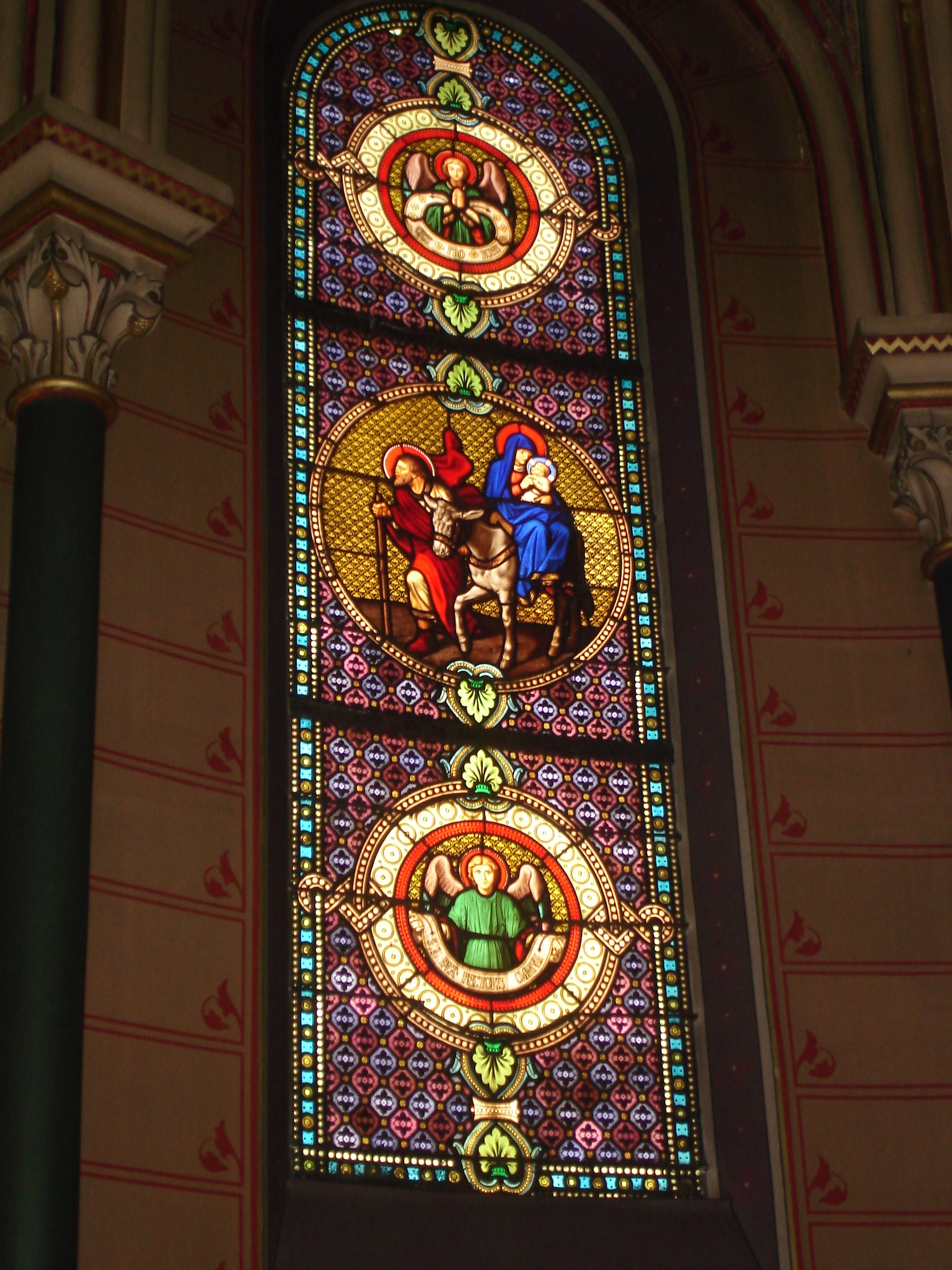
"The Flight into Egypt"

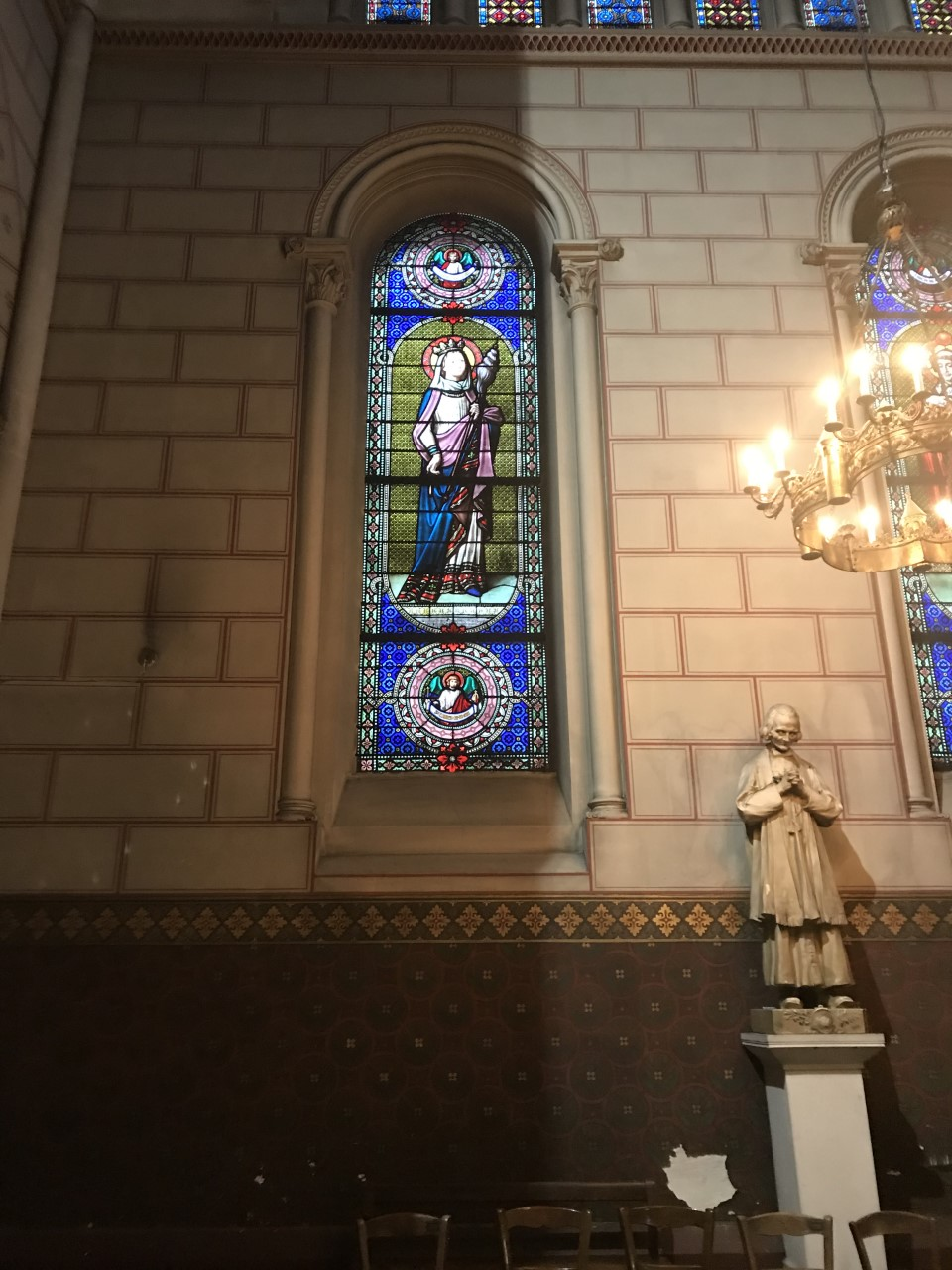
Window of Saint Elizabeth of Hungary

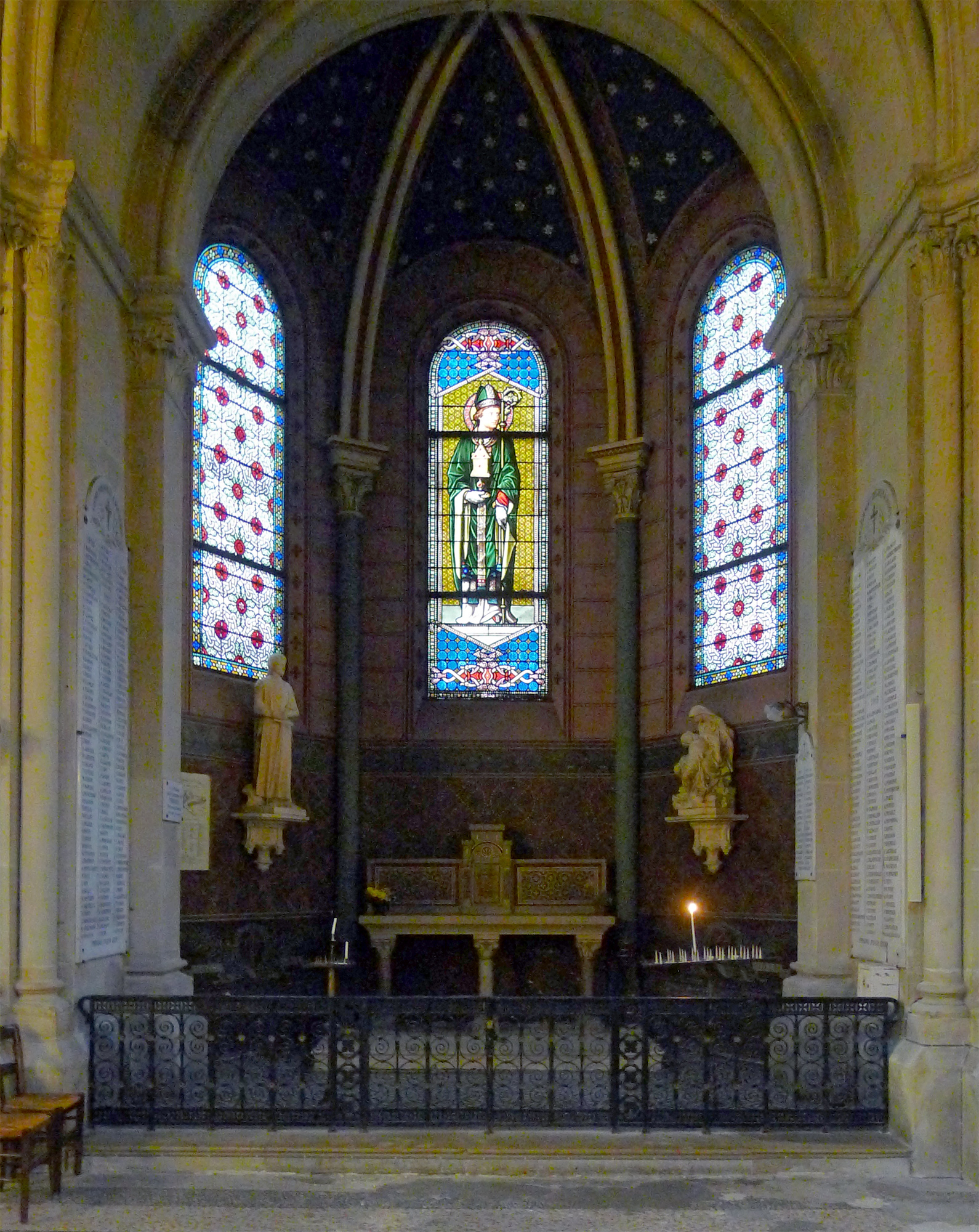
Chapel of Saint Denis, with his portrait in glass

=== Paintings within the porch ===
Over the portals within the porch are three paintings made with Vitreous Enamel, a technique popular in Romanesque art.

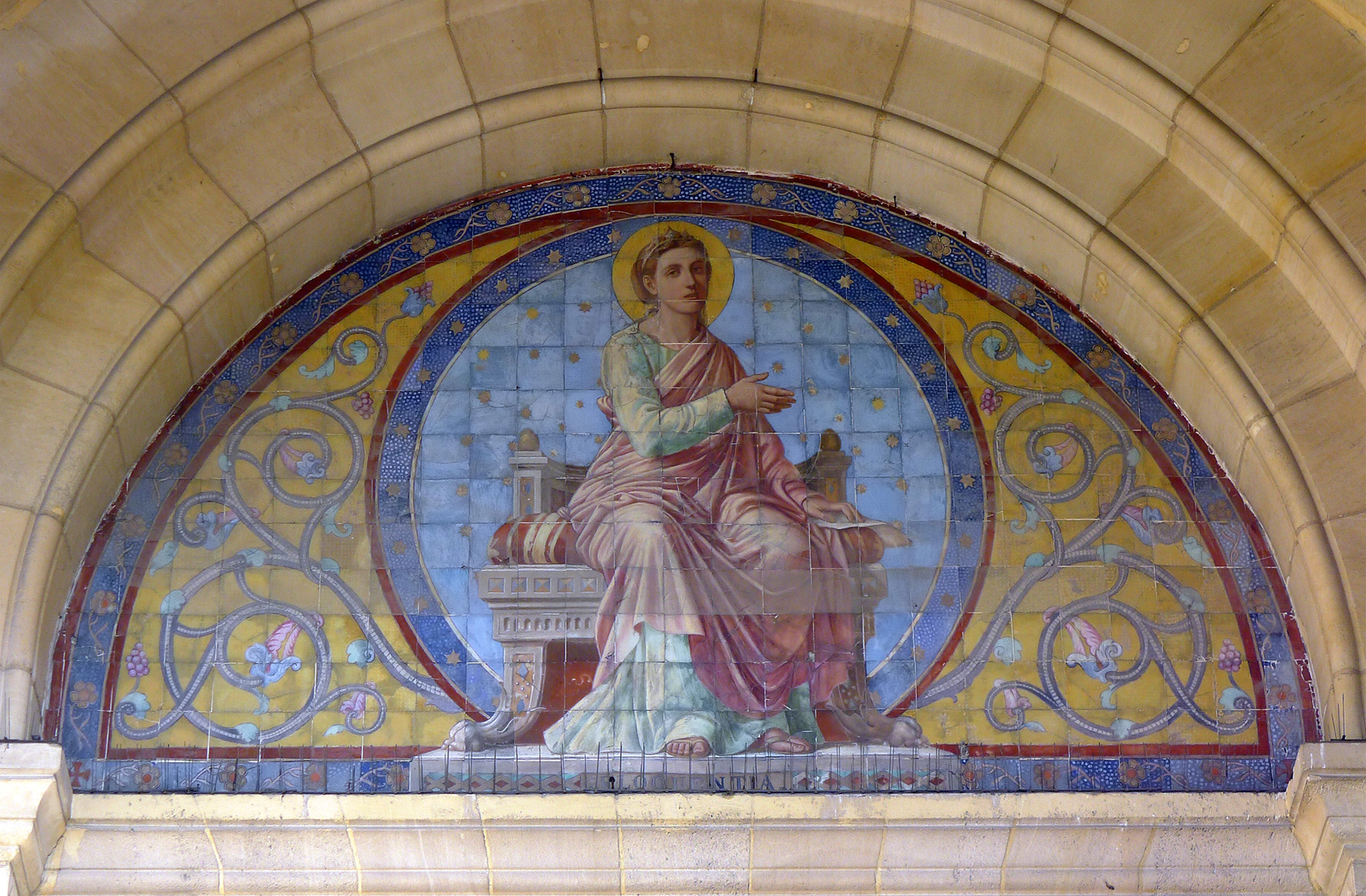
Vitreous enamel Painting of "Eloquence" over portal

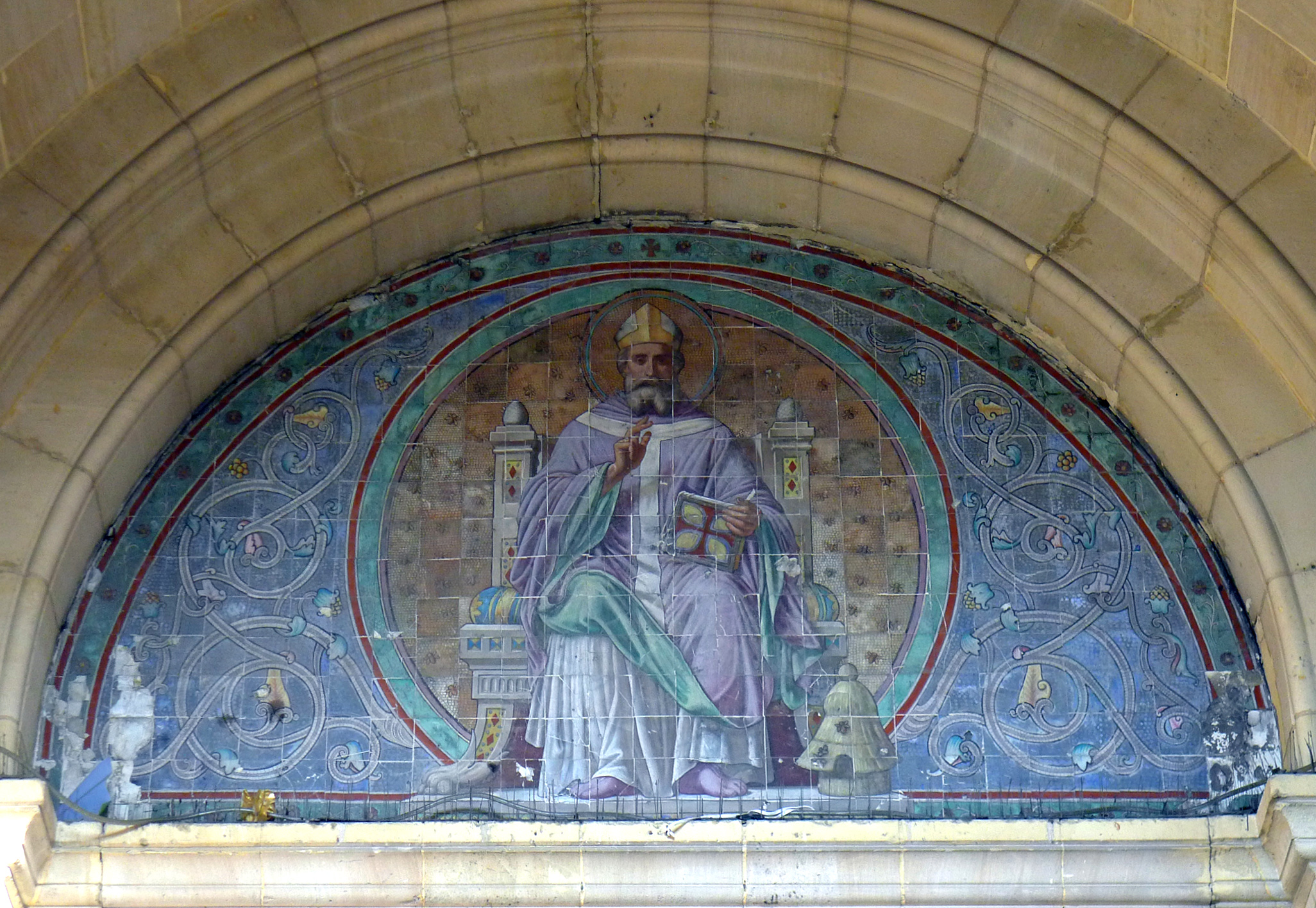
Vitreous enamel painting of Saint Ambroise.

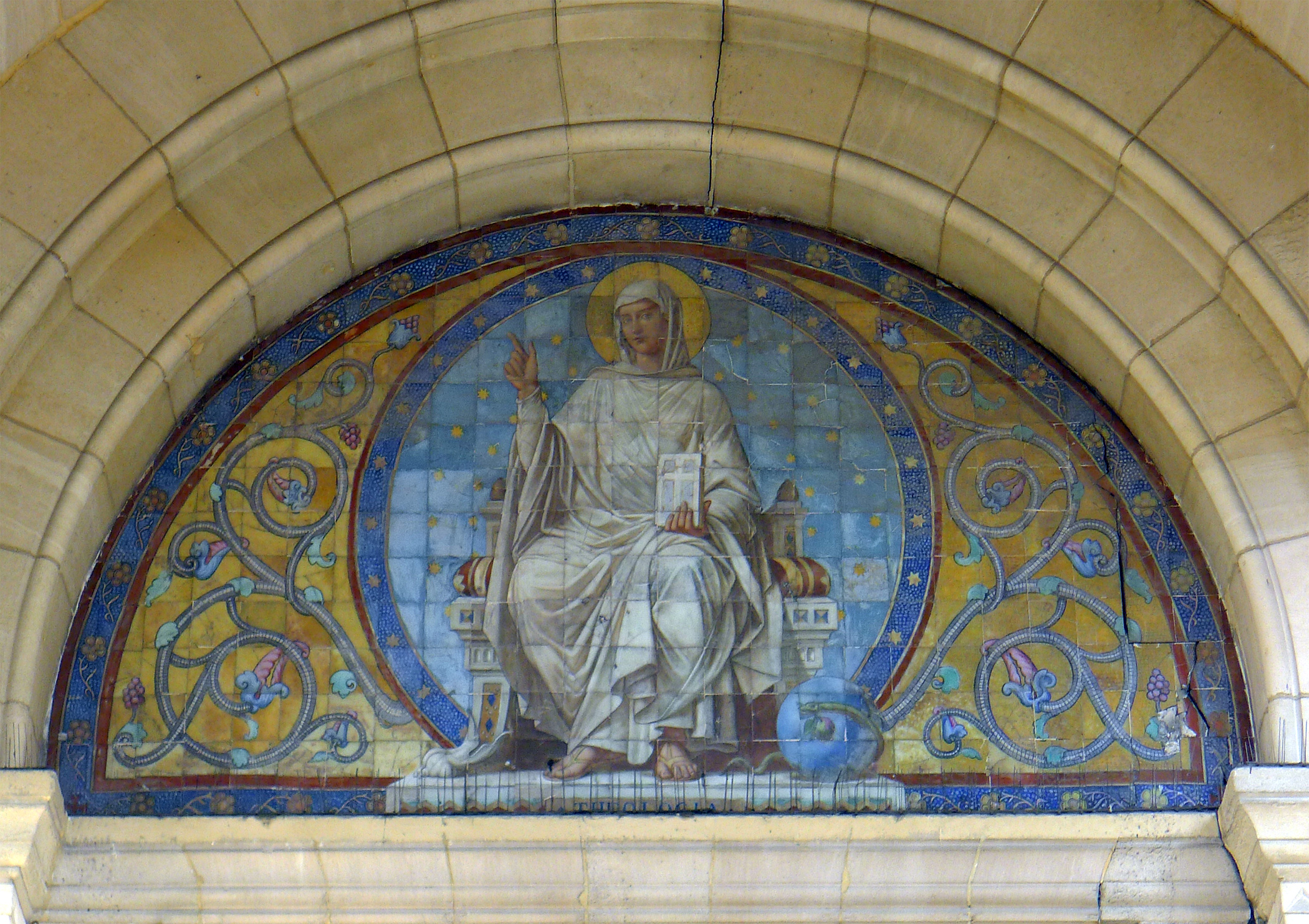
Vitreous enamel Painting of "Theology"

=== Murals ===
In the chapel of Saint-Augustine in the transept displays four murals depicting scenes from he life of Saint Augustine painted by Jules-Eugène Lenepveu. His paintings are found. in several of the churches built by Emperor Louis-Napoleon.

In the left chapel of the transept one mural depicts Saint Augustine reconciling the Catholics and the Donatists at the Council of Carthage. The second shows Saint Augustine stopping the practice of having parents fight as practice for war.

In the right chapel of the transept are two other paintings of Lenepveu; "Saint Augustine bearing entry to the church in Milan to the Emperor Theodosius"; and "Saint Ambroise turns over sacred vases to purchase the freedom of prisoners."

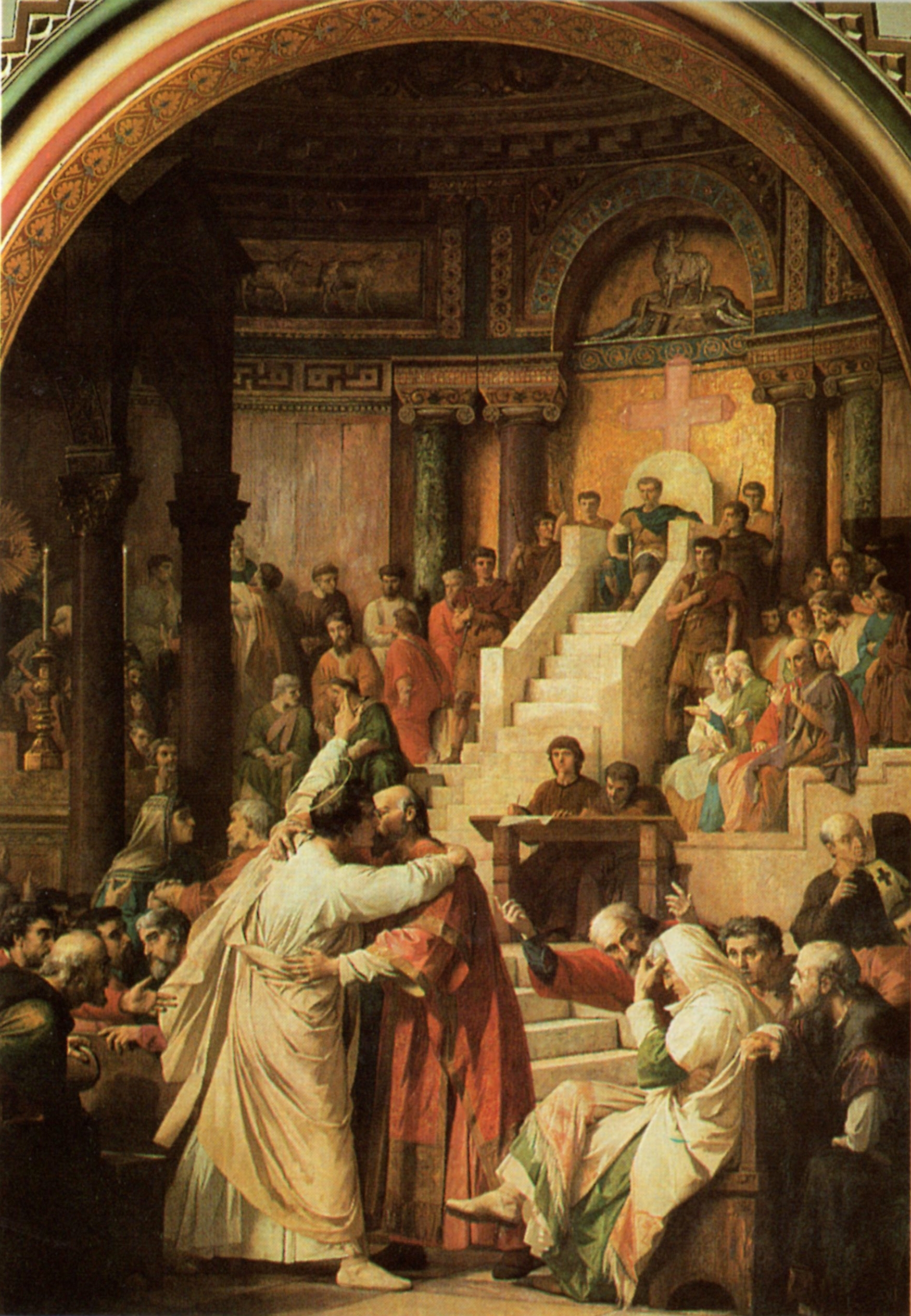
"Saint Augustine reconciles Catholics and Donatists" by Jules-Eugène Lenepveu

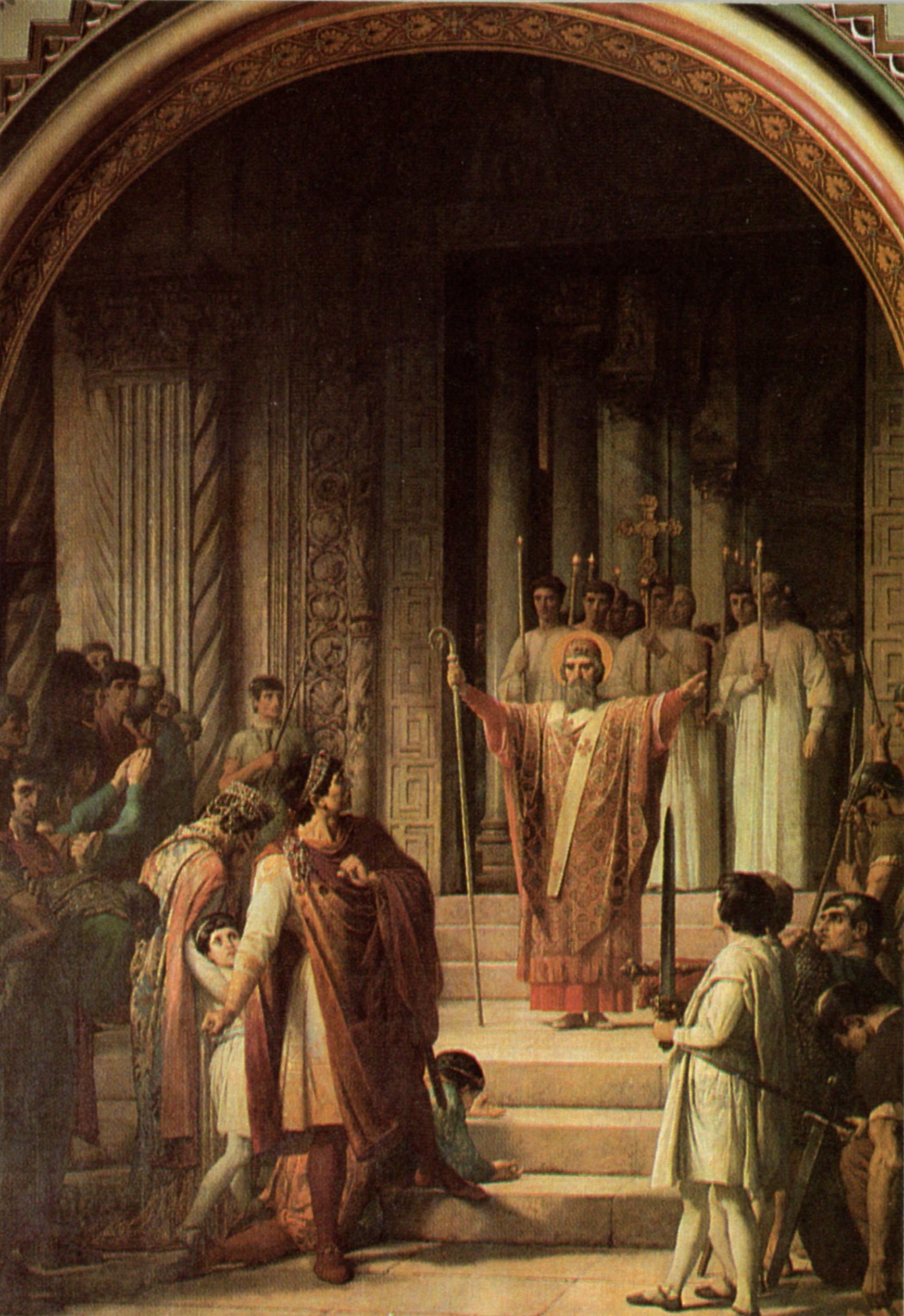
"Saint Augustine bars entry to the church of Milan to the Emperor Theodosius "by Jules-Eugène Lenepveu

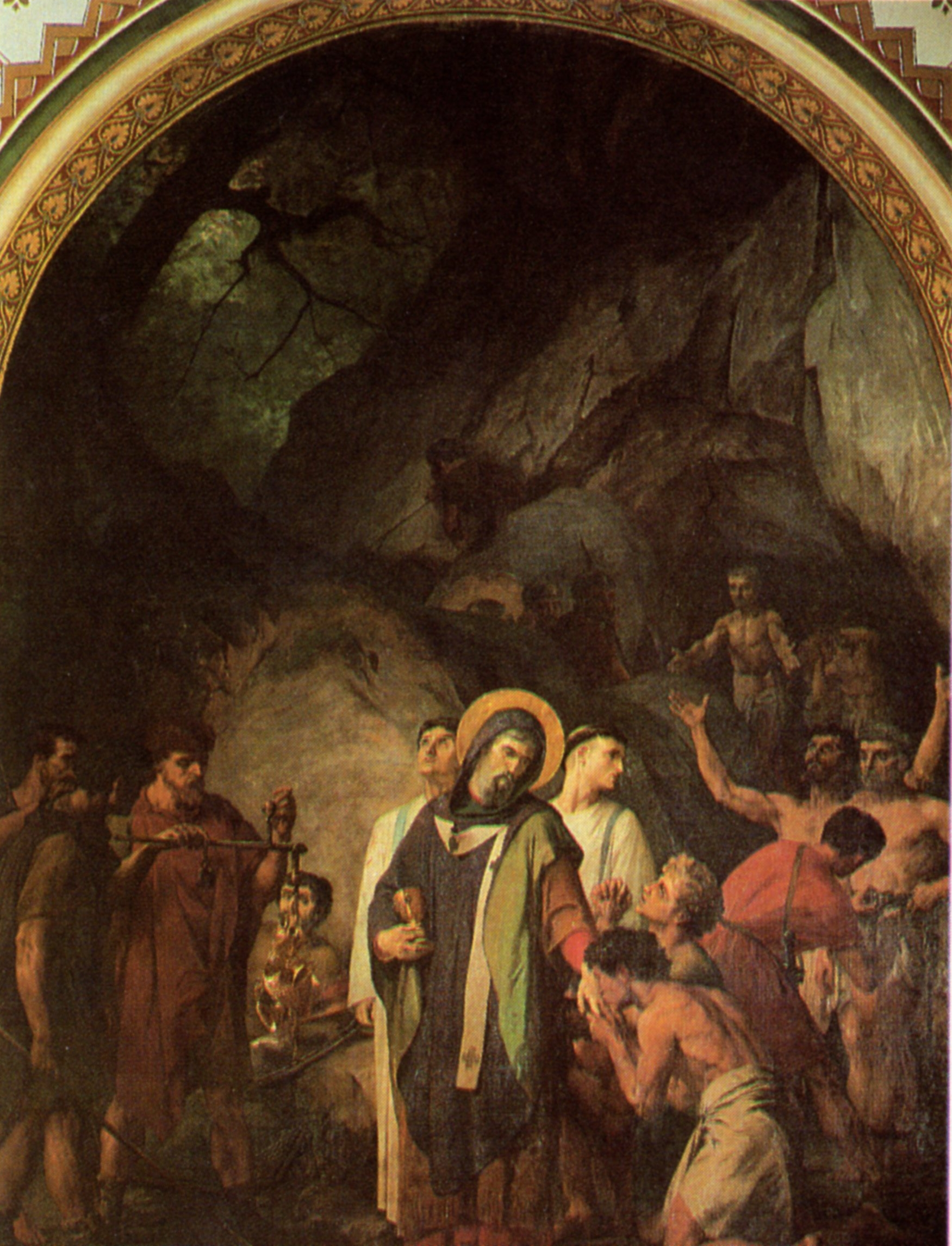
"Saint Augustin gives sacred vases from his church to purchase freedom for prisoners" by Jules-Eugène Lenepveu(Lenepveu)

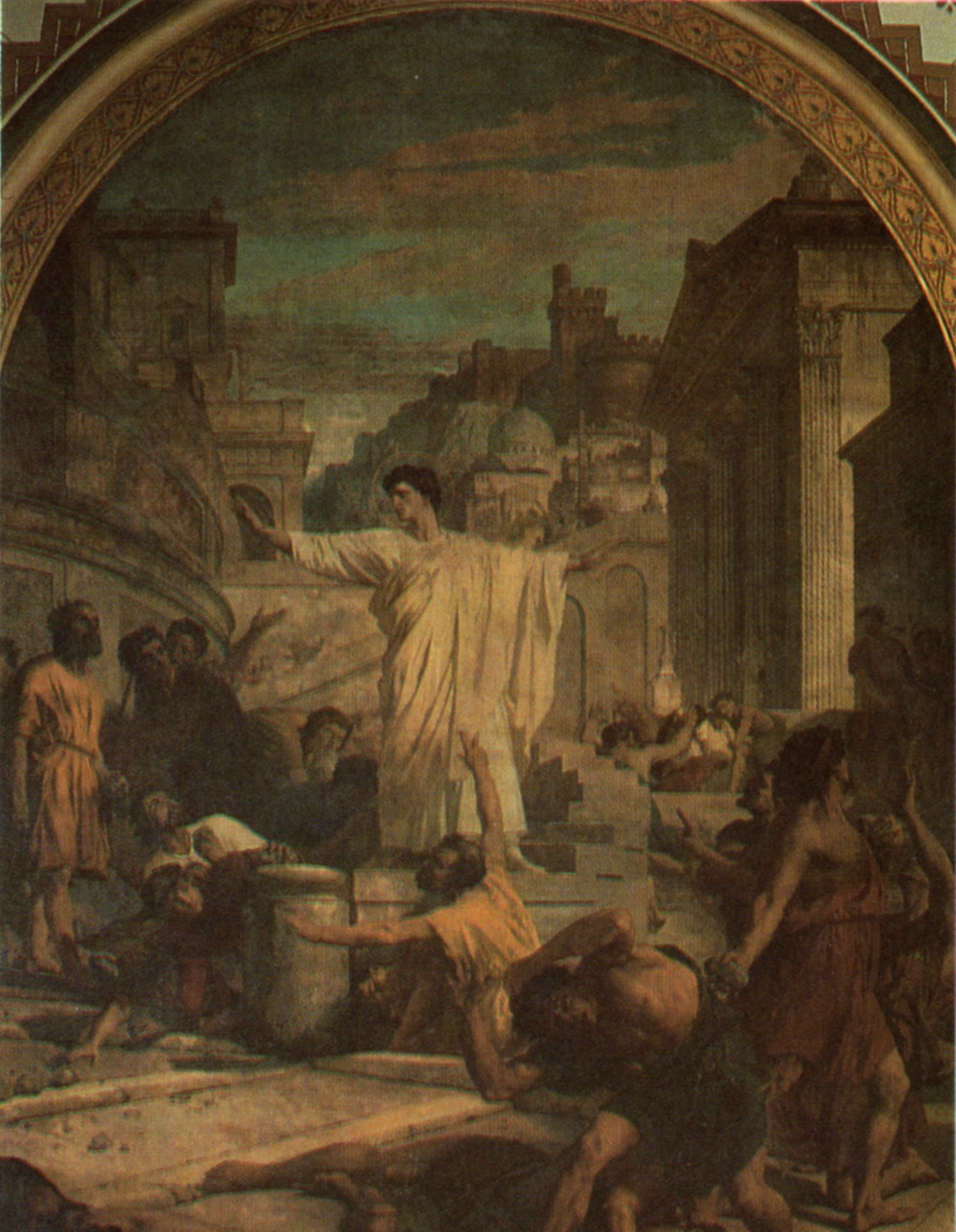
"Saint Augustine stops children from practicing for war", by Jules-Eugène Lenepveu

The chapel of Saint-Augustine in the transept displays four murals depicting scenes from he life of Saint Augustine painted by Jules-Eugène Lenepveu. His paintings are found. in several of the churches built by Emperor Louis-Napoleon.

In the left chapel of the transept one mural depicts Saint Augustine reconciling the Catholics and the Donatists at the Council of Carthage. The second shows Saint Augustine stopping the practice of having parents fight as practice for war.

In the right chapel of the transept are two other paintings of Lenepveu; "Saint Augustine bearing entry to the church in Milan to the Emperor Theodosius"; and "Saint Ambroise turns over sacred vases to purchase the freedom of prisoners."

== Decorative Works ==
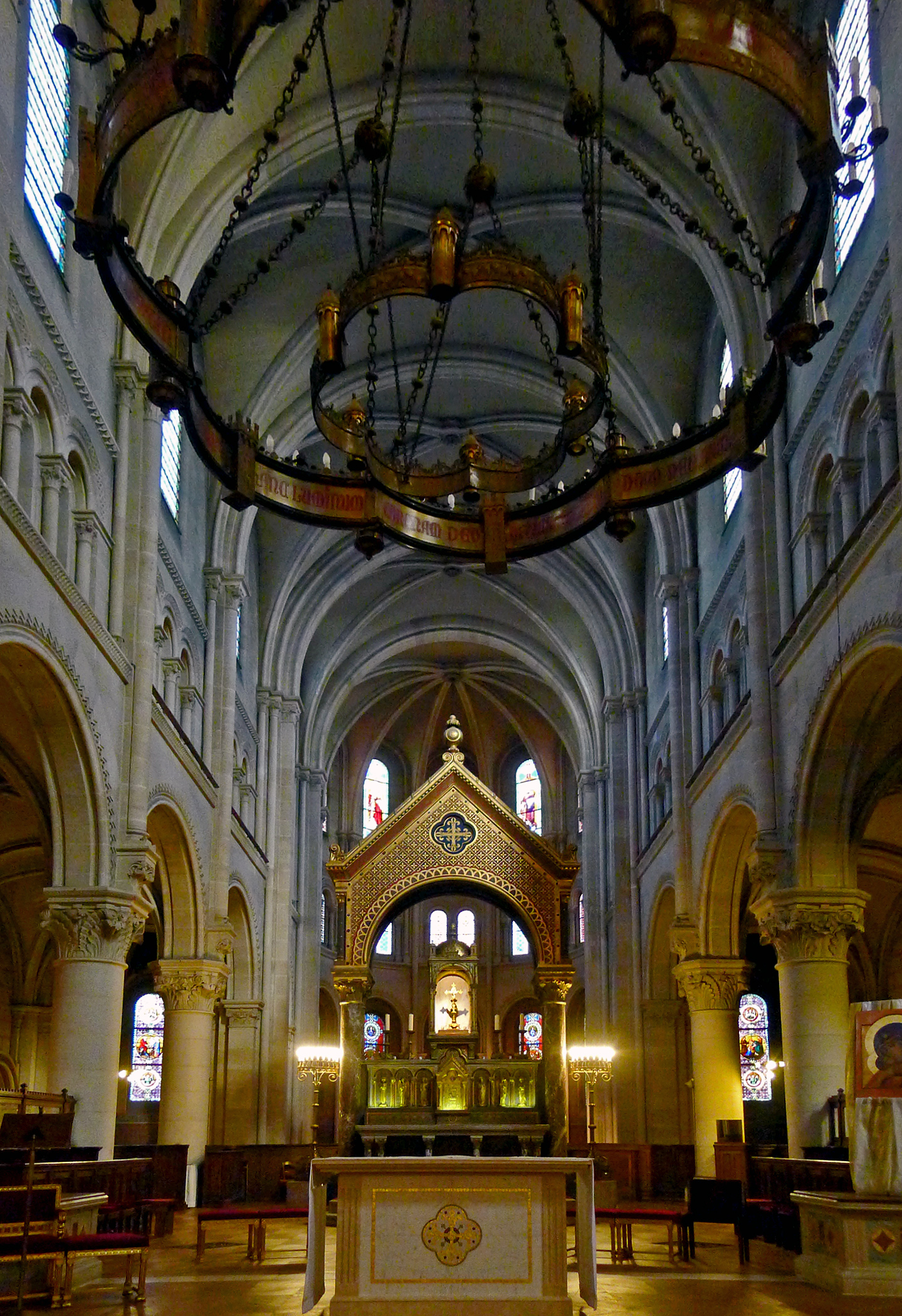
Altar with baldequin (Canopy) and chandelier

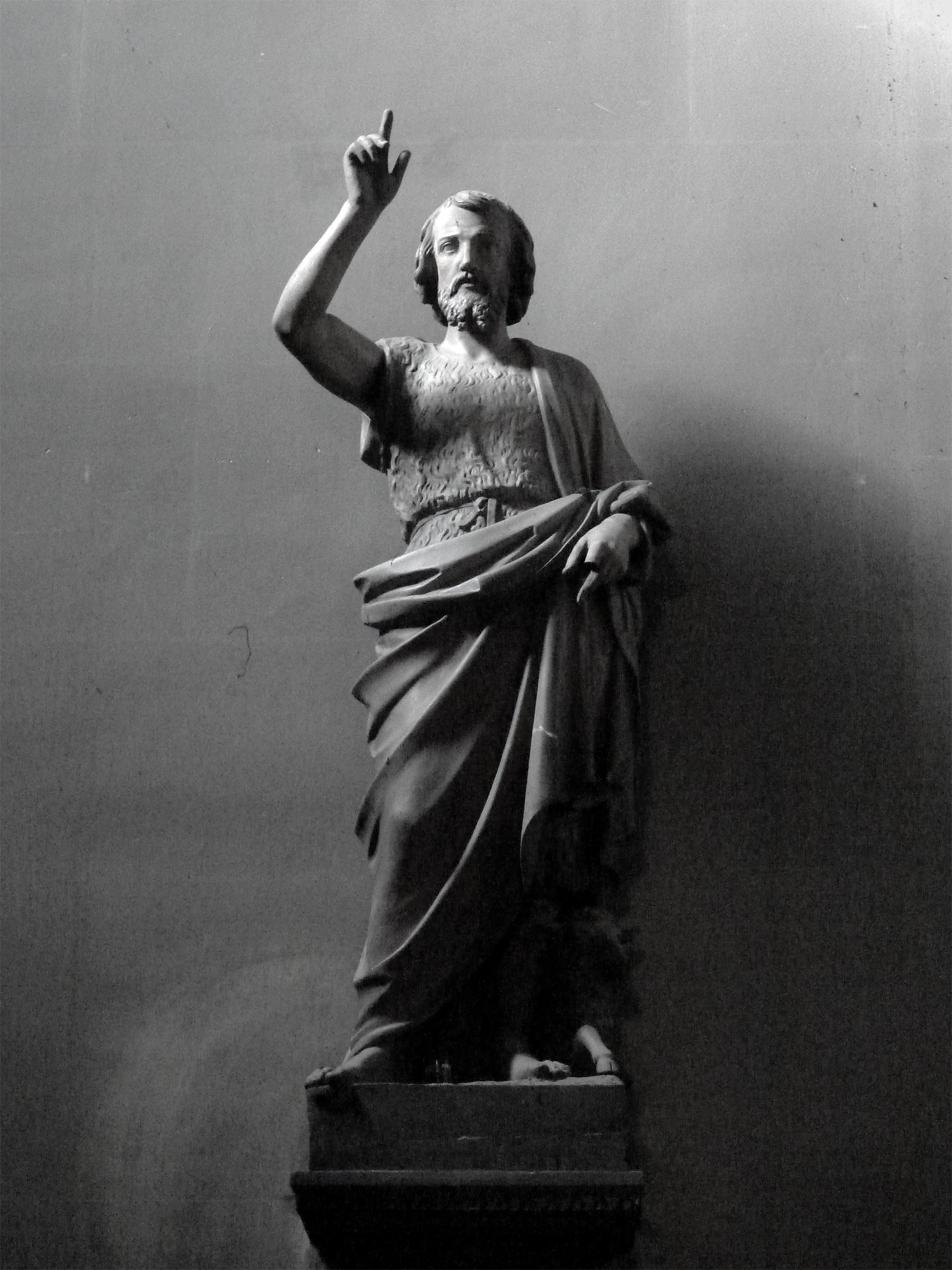
Statue of Saint John the Baptist (19th c.)

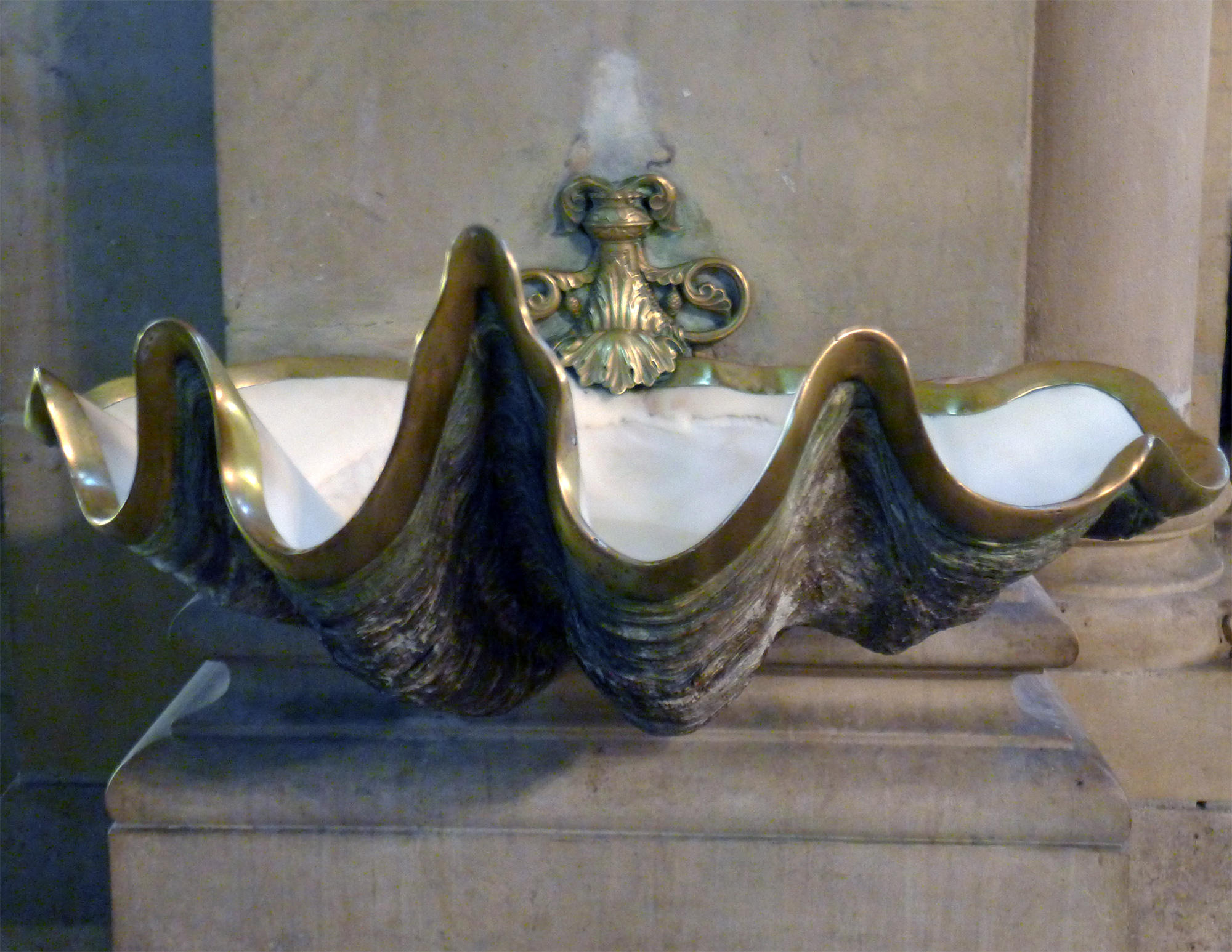
Bénitier (Holder for Holy Water)

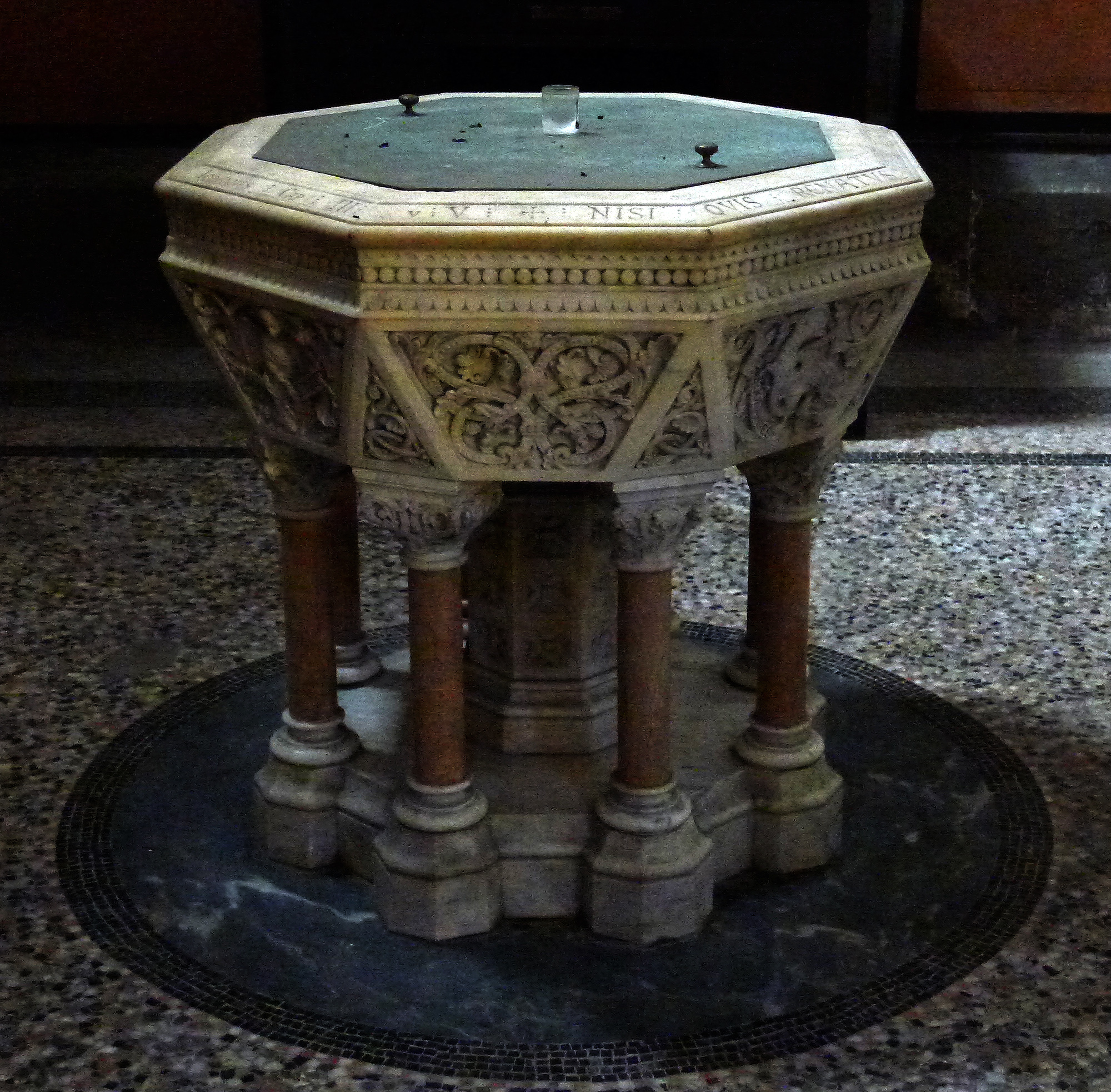
Baptismal Font

== Grand organ ==
The grand organ on the tribune over the entrance was built by the firm of Merklin-Schutze in 1869. It features 32 "jeux" or notes, three keyboards and foot pedals. A smaller organ is located in the choir behind the altar. also made by Merklin. It has thirteen "jeux" on two manual keyboards, and foot pedals.

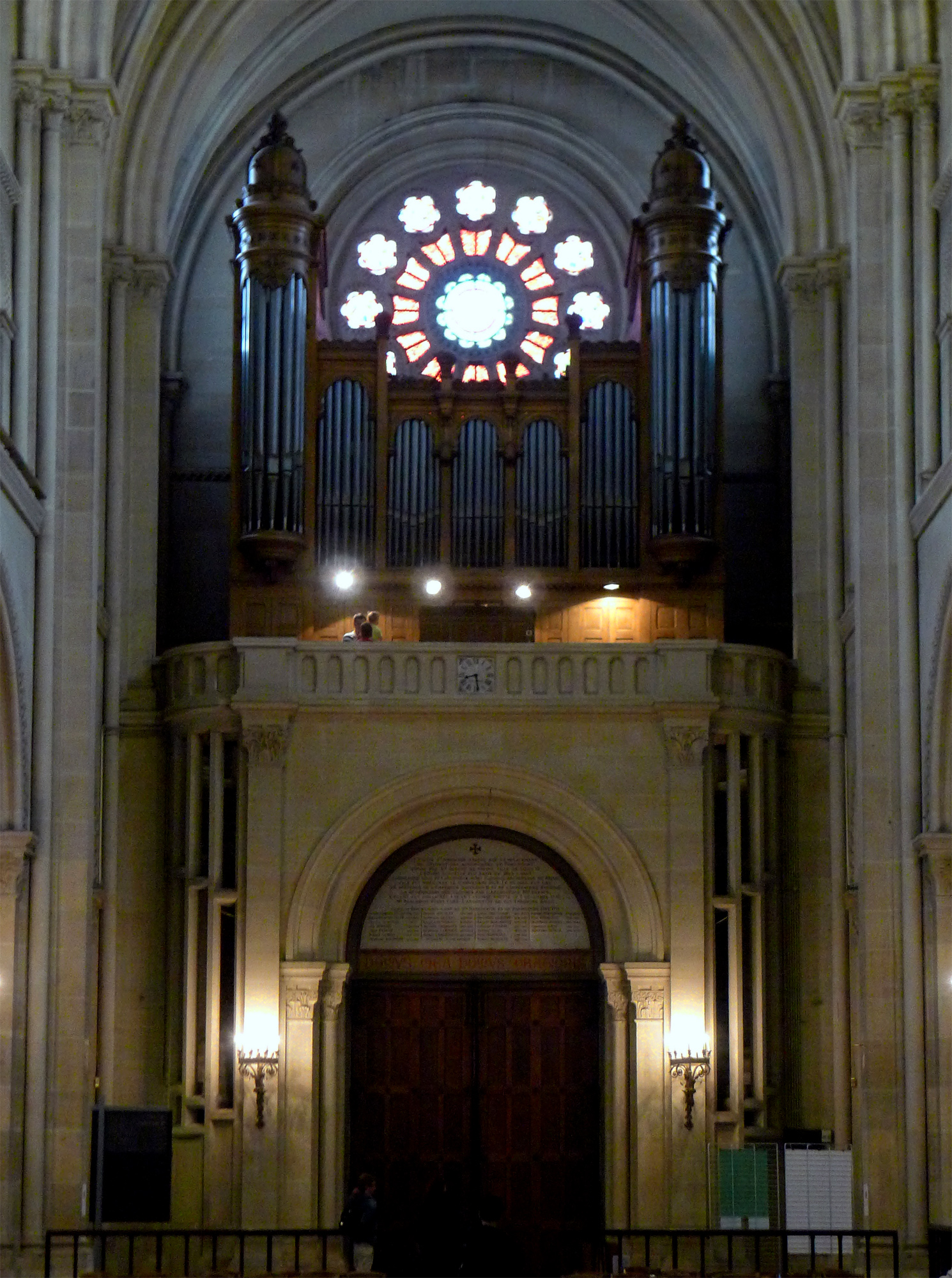
Site of the main organ, over the portal

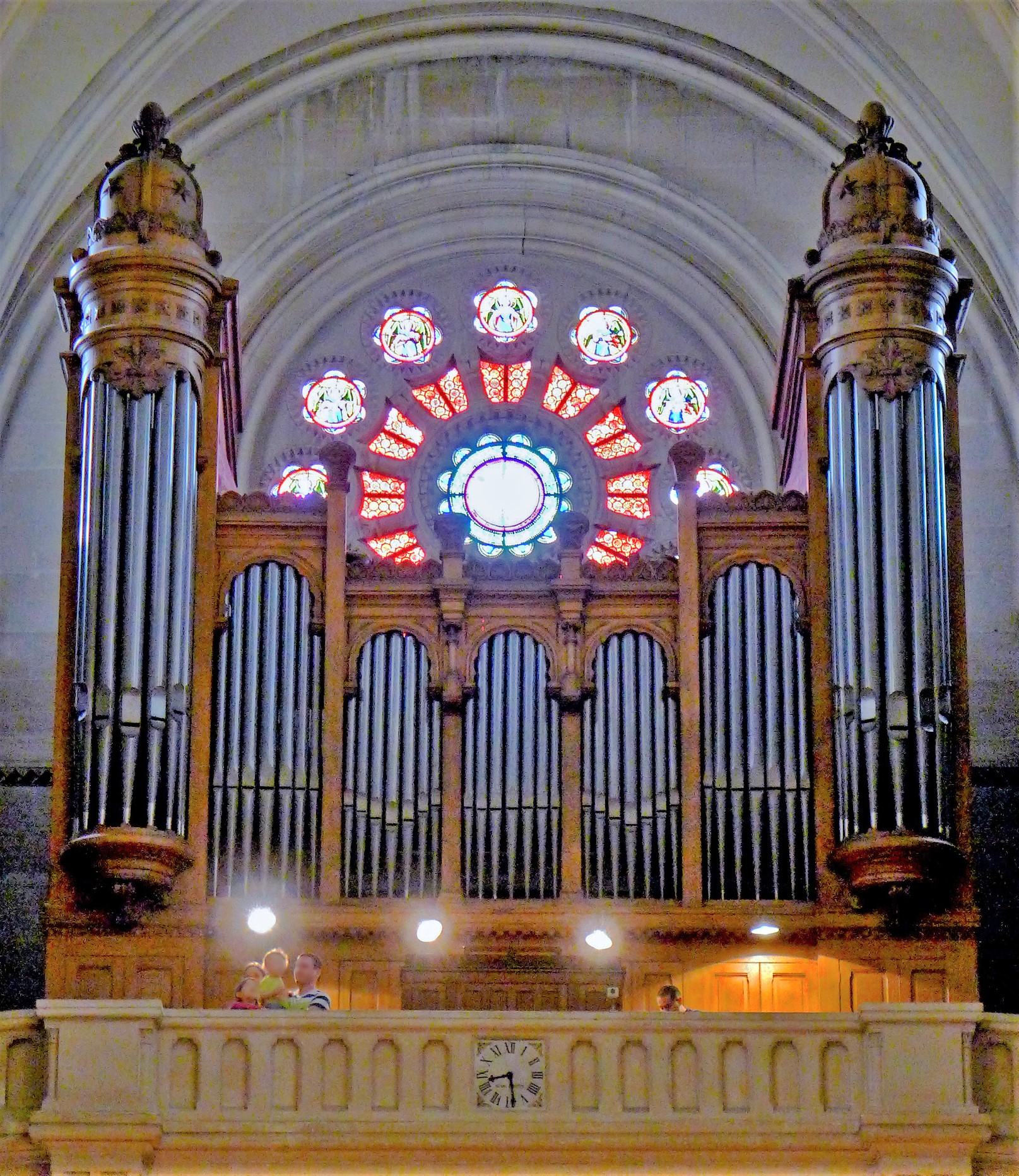
The main organ, in the tribune (1869)

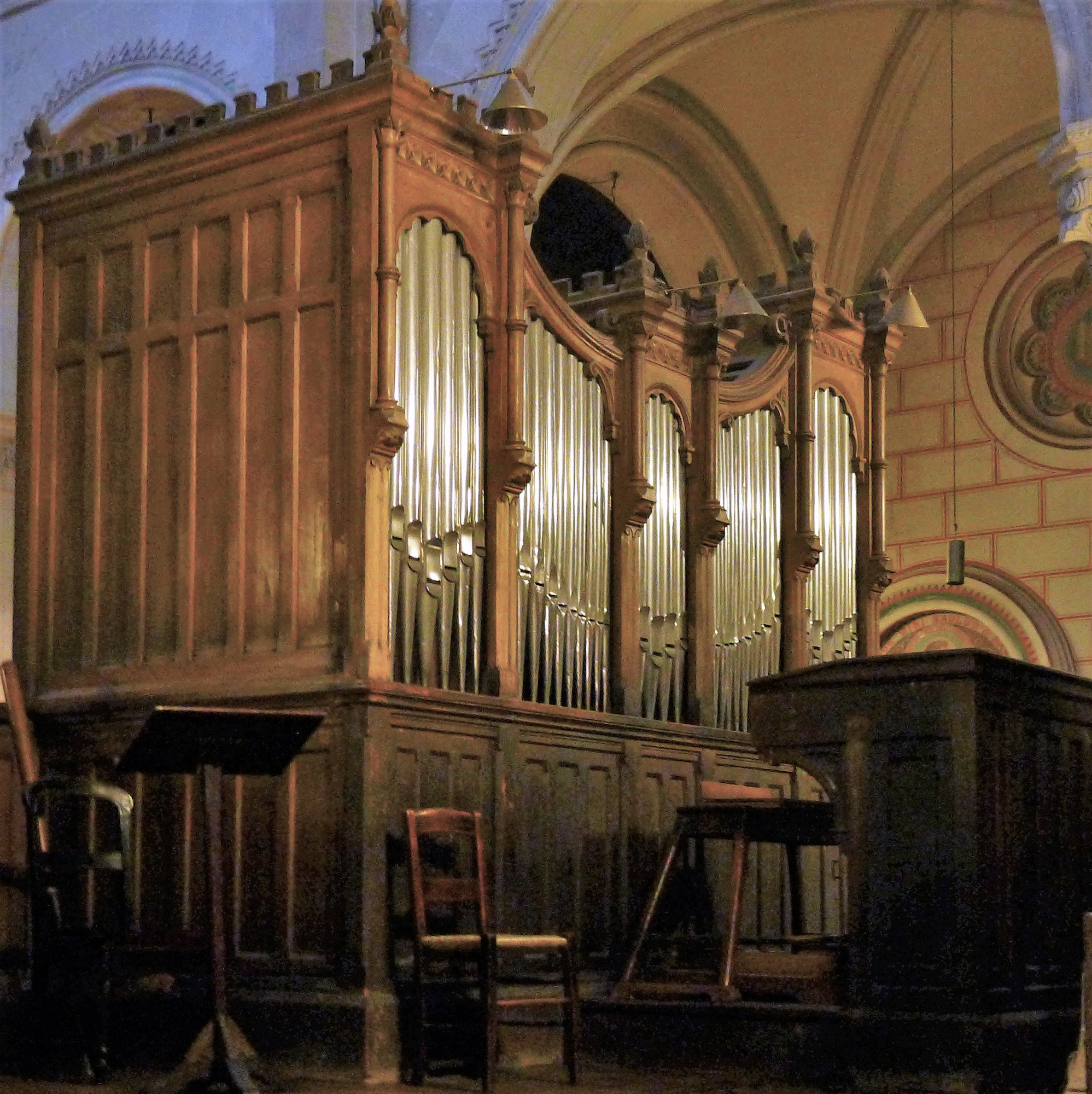
Choir organ of St. Ambrose

== Bells ==
The three bells of the church are hung in the tower on the right. They are named Sainte Eugenie (1650 kilograms); Sainte Marie (1,100 kilograms) and Sainte Catherine (816 kilograms).

== Bibliography ==
- Michaux, M. L., "Histoire et description de l'église de Saint-Ambroise", published 1883 in Paris. (online at BnF Gallica)
