= Saint-Ambroise station =

Metro station in Paris, France

Saint-Ambroise
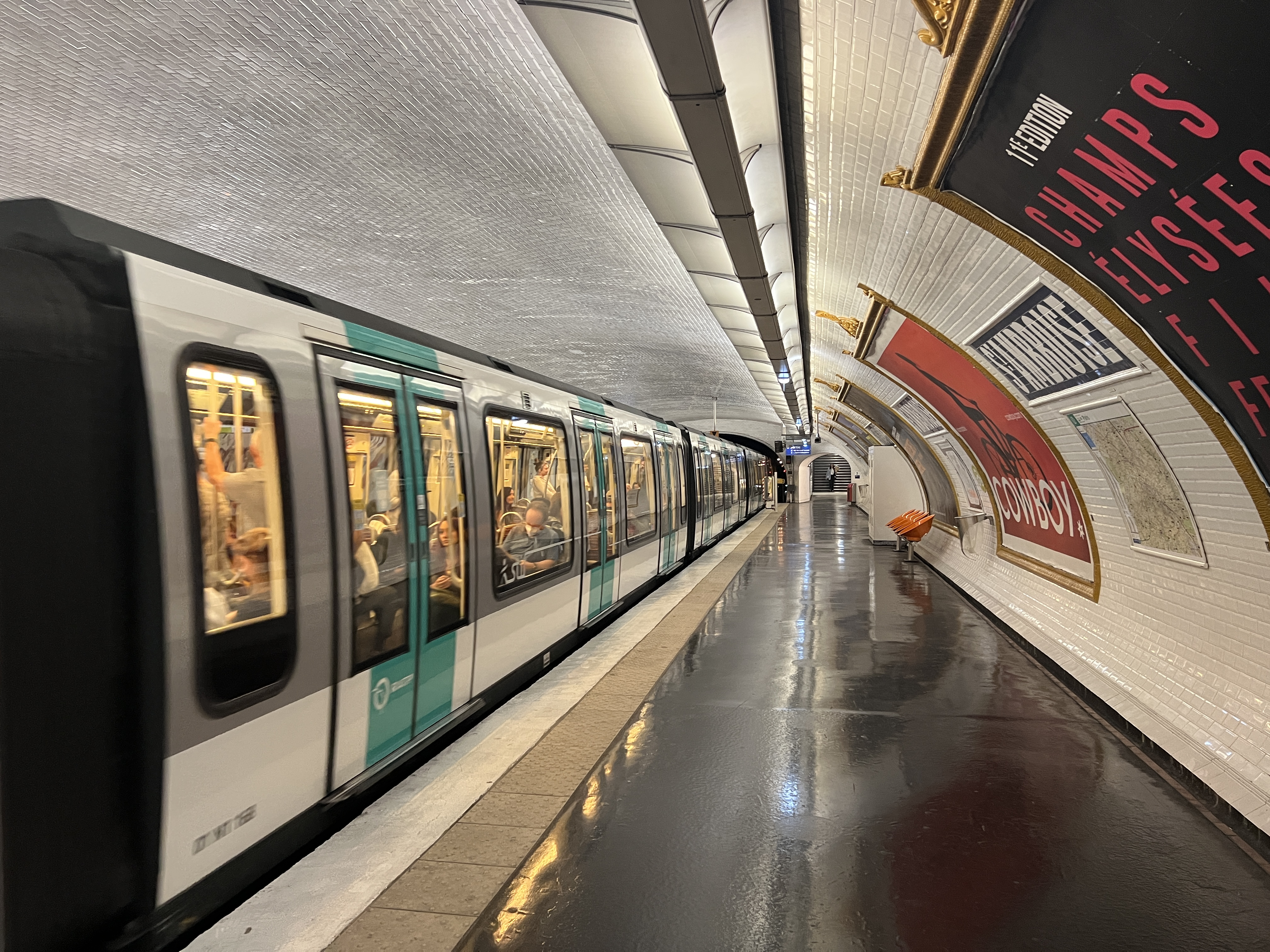

General information
- Location: 11th arrondissement of Paris; Île-de-France; France
- Coordinates: 48°51′41″N 2°22′27″E
- System: Paris Métro station
- Owner: RATP
- Operator: RATP

Other information
- Fare zone: 1

History
- Opened: 10 December 1933

Services
Preceding station	Paris Metro	Following station
Oberkampf towards Pont de Sèvres	Line 9	Voltaire towards Mairie de Montreuil
Location
- Location within Paris

Saint-Ambroise (French pronunciation: [sɛ̃t‿ɑ̃bʁwaz]) is a station on Line 9 of the Paris Métro, located in the 11th arrondissement of Paris. It is under Boulevard Voltaire.

== Location ==
The station is located under Boulevard Voltaire, northwest of the Rue Saint-Ambroise exit. Oriented along a north-west / south-east axis, it is situated between the Oberkampf and the Voltaire stations.

== History ==
Saint-Ambroise station was opened on 10 December 1933 following the extension of Line 9 from Richelieu–Drouot to Porte de Montreuil.

Its namesake is the street it is located under (Rue Saint-Ambroise), where a church bearing the same name can also be found. Rue Saint-Ambroise and the church of Saint-Ambroise pay homage to Ambrose of Milan (340–394), bishop of Milan from 374 to 397, born in Trier, Germany, whose father was a prefect of Gaul. The church was rebuilt following a decree of 24 January 1863 during the modernisation of the newly created Saint-Ambroise district.

At the end of the 1990s, the station was chosen by the RATP to test the prototypes of the main lighting model that would be deployed on the platforms of many other stations renovated as part of the Espace Métro 2000 operation subsequently entitled Renouveau du Métro and then Une métro + beau. In 1998, it became the first in a series of 273 futures to benefit from the components. However, its corridors were only modernised on 20 December 2005.

In 2018, 3,037,654 passengers entered this station which places it at the 183rd out of 302.

== Services for passengers ==
=== Access ===
The station has five access points, each consisting of a fixed staircase:

- access 1 - Saint-Ambroise - adorned with a Dervaux candelabra, opening right off 1 Rue de la Folie-Mericourt, crn. Boulevard Voltaire;
- access 2 - Boulevard Voltaire - facing 78 Boulevard Voltaire;
- access 3 - Rue Popincourt - located right of 86 Boulevard Voltaire (between the Jardin Truillot and l'impasse Truillot);
- access 4 - Boulevard Richard-Lenoir - opening facing 60 Boulevard Voltaire;
- access 5 - Rue Saint-Sébastien - located at 57 Boulevard Voltaire.

=== Station layout ===
Street Level

B1	Mezzanine

Line 9 platforms	Side platform, doors will open on the right
Line 9 platforms	Westbound	← toward Pont de Sèvres (Oberkampf)
Line 9 platforms	Eastbound	toward Mairie de Montreuil (Voltaire) →
Line 9 platforms	Side platform, doors will open on the right

=== Platforms ===
Saint-Ambroise is a standard configuration station. It has two platforms separated by metro tracks and the arch is elliptical. The decoration is the style used for most metro stations. The lighting strips are white and rounded in the Gaudin style of the metro revival of the 2000s (although they have a second row of reflectors, a prototype variant that was not reused), and the white ceramic tiled tiles cover the walls, the vault, the tunnel exits, and the outlets of the corridors. The advertising frames are faience honey colour in the original CMP style and the name of the station is also in faience. The Akiko style seats are orange. Access is via both ends of the platform.

=== Bus connections ===
The station is served by Line 56 of the RATP Bus Network.

== Nearby ==
- Église Saint-Ambroise de Paris
- Jardin des Moines-de-Tibhirine
- Jardin Truillot
