= Voltaire station =

Metro station in Paris, France

Voltaire
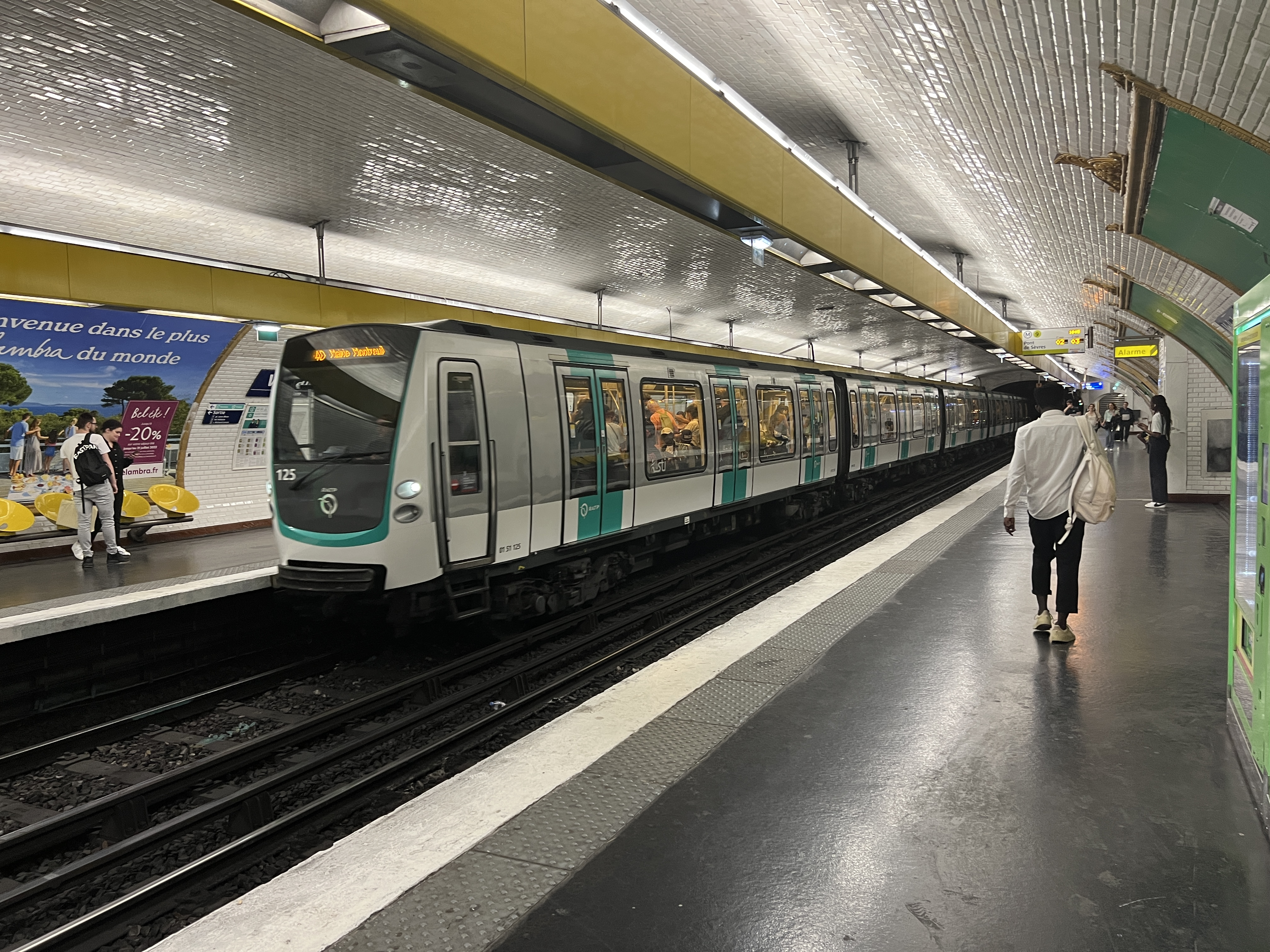
- MF 01 rolling stock at Voltaire in 2022

General information
- Location: 11th arrondissement of Paris; Île-de-France; France
- Coordinates: 48°51′28″N 2°22′48″E
- System: Paris Métro station
- Owner: RATP
- Operator: RATP

Other information
- Fare zone: 1

History
- Opened: 10 December 1933

Services
Preceding station	Paris Metro	Following station
Saint-Ambroise towards Pont de Sèvres	Line 9	Charonne towards Mairie de Montreuil
Location
- Location within Paris

Voltaire (French pronunciation: [vɔltɛːʁ]) is a station on Line 9 of the Paris Métro. The station is located under Place Léon Blum (formerly Place Voltaire) along with the town hall of the 11th arrondissement, which serves a lively district.

The station was opened on 10 December 1933 with the extension of the line from Richelieu–Drouot to Porte de Montreuil. It is named after Rue Voltaire, which itself is named after François-Marie Arouet (1694–1778), better known under the pen name Voltaire, a French Enlightenment writer and philosopher.

== Station layout ==
Street Level

B1	Mezzanine

Line 9 platforms	Side platform, doors will open on the right
Line 9 platforms	Westbound	← toward Pont de Sèvres (Saint-Ambroise)
Line 9 platforms	Eastbound	toward Mairie de Montreuil (Charonne) →
Line 9 platforms	Side platform, doors will open on the right
