= Jules-Eugène Lenepveu =

French painter

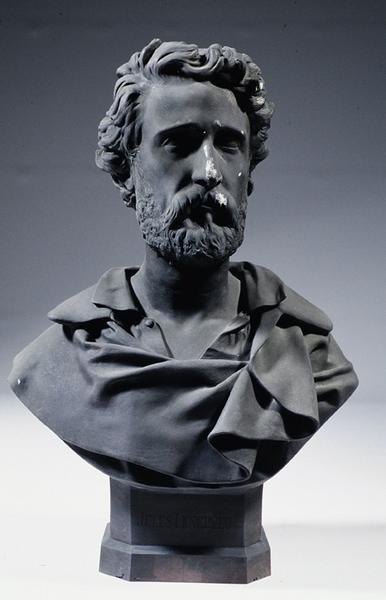
Jules Eugène Lenepveu: bust by Auguste Arnaud

Jules-Eugène Lenepveu (1819 – 16 October 1898) was a French painter.

== Biography ==
Born at Angers, he studied at the école des Beaux-Arts, and later was a pupil of François-Édouard Picot in Paris. He entered the École nationale. After winning the Prix de Rome in 1847 with his painting of The Death of Vitellius, he went to Rome to complete his education. He became famous for his vast historical canvases, including the ceilings of the Opéra de Paris (1869–71; covered by a Marc Chagall work), and of the theatre at Angers (1871). He was director of the French Academy in Rome from 1872 to 1878. Between 1886 and 1890, he painted the fresco of the life of Joan of Arc at the Panthéon, Paris.

In 1900, two years after his death, a monument to him was put up in the courtyard of the Musée des Beaux-Arts, and a pedestrianised street in Angers was later named after him.

== Scenes from the Legend of Joan of Arc ==
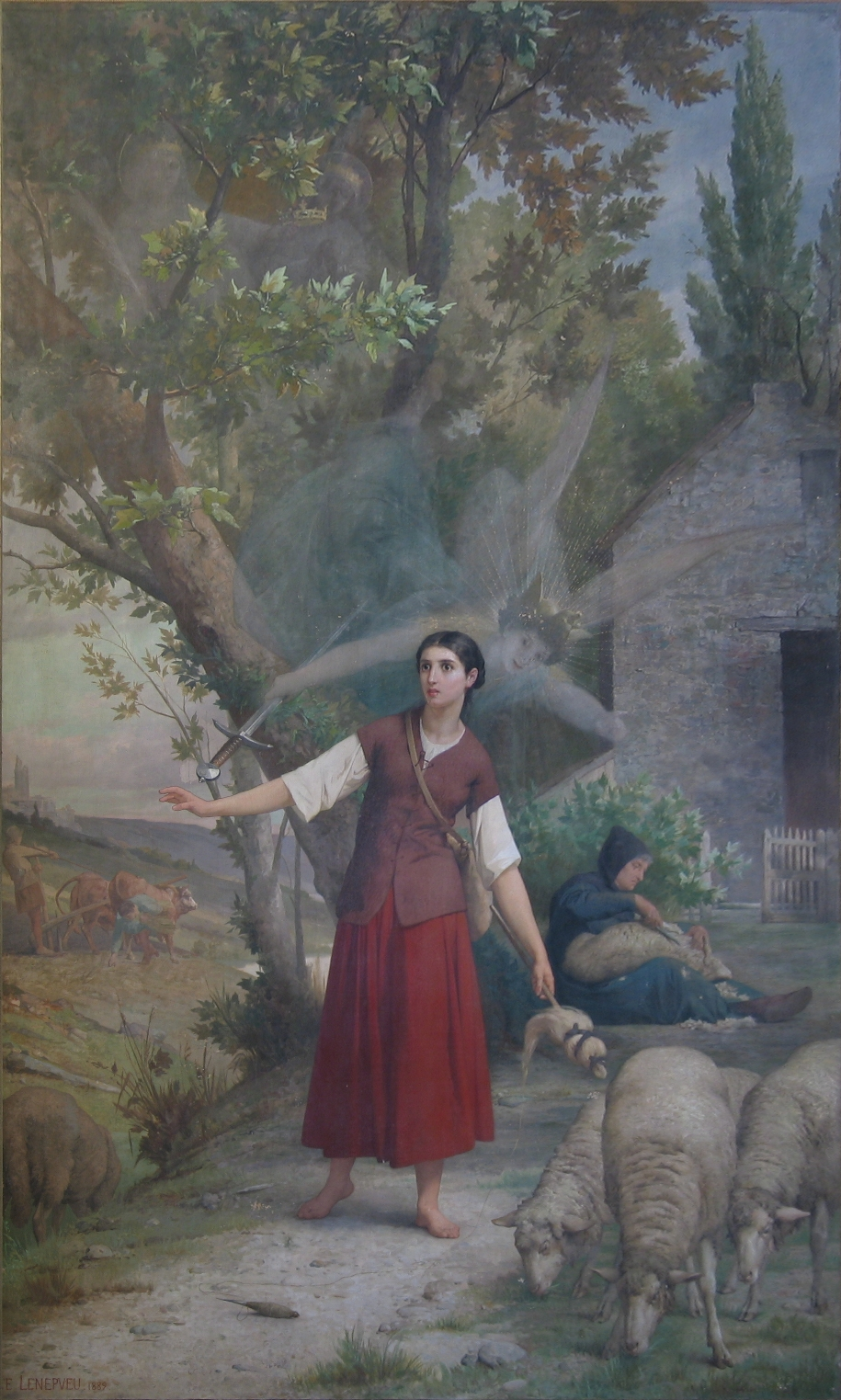
Joan as Shepherdess

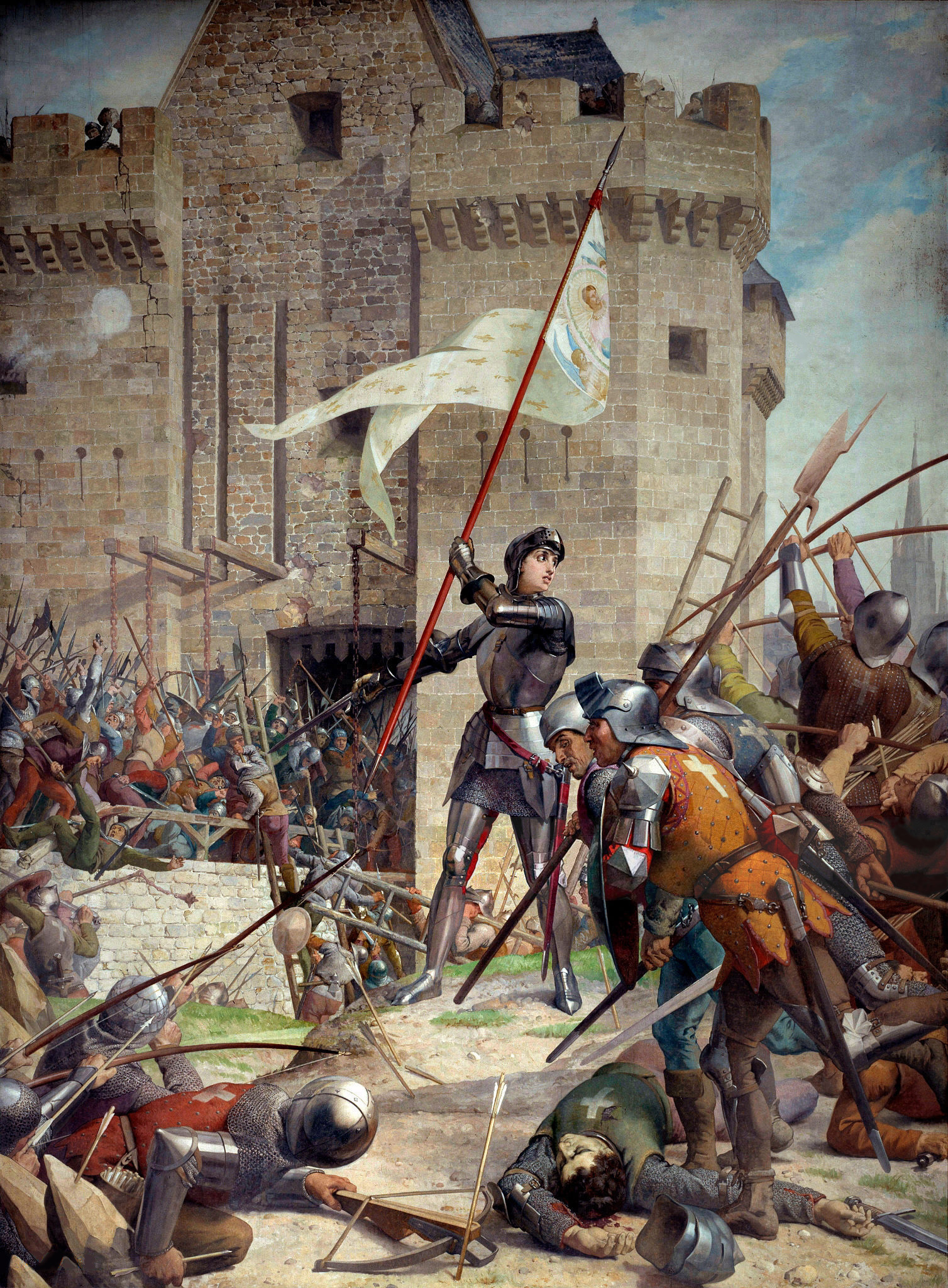
Joan in Armour at Orléans

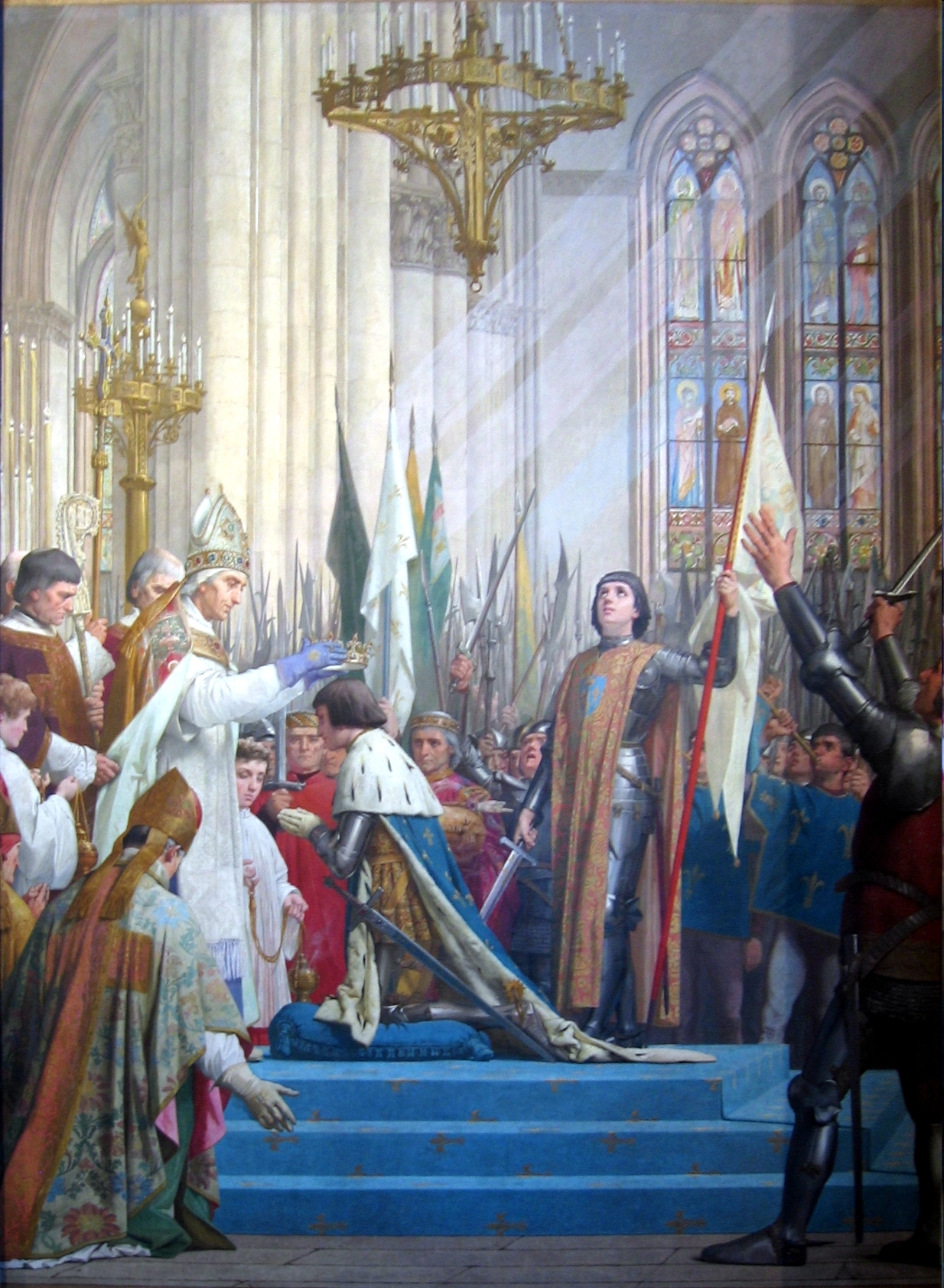
Joan in Reims Cathedral

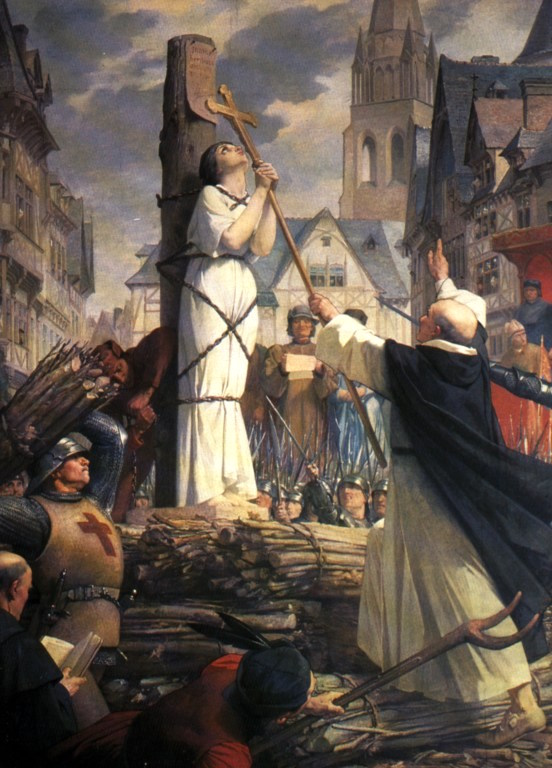
Joan at the Stake in Rouen
