= Oberkampf =

Oberkampf may refer to:

- Christophe-Philippe Oberkampf, a French industrialist of German origin
- a street in Paris, Rue Oberkampf, 11th arrondissement of Paris, and its surrounding area
- a Paris metro station, see Oberkampf (Paris Metro)
- a French rock band, see Oberkampf (band)
