= Marie Gahéry =

French politician (1867–1932)

- Born: 1867
- Died: 1932 (aged 64–65)
- Occupations: Social worker, educationalist

Marie Gahéry (1867–1932) was a French Catholic social worker and educationalist. Gahéry was the founder of the Union familiale, an organisation that provided nursery education for the children of working-class families, and of the Œuvre sociale de Popincourt in the 11th arrondissement of Paris, a first attempt in France to found something along the lines of the social settlements of Britain and the United States.
