= Oberkampf station =

Metro station in Paris, France

Oberkampf
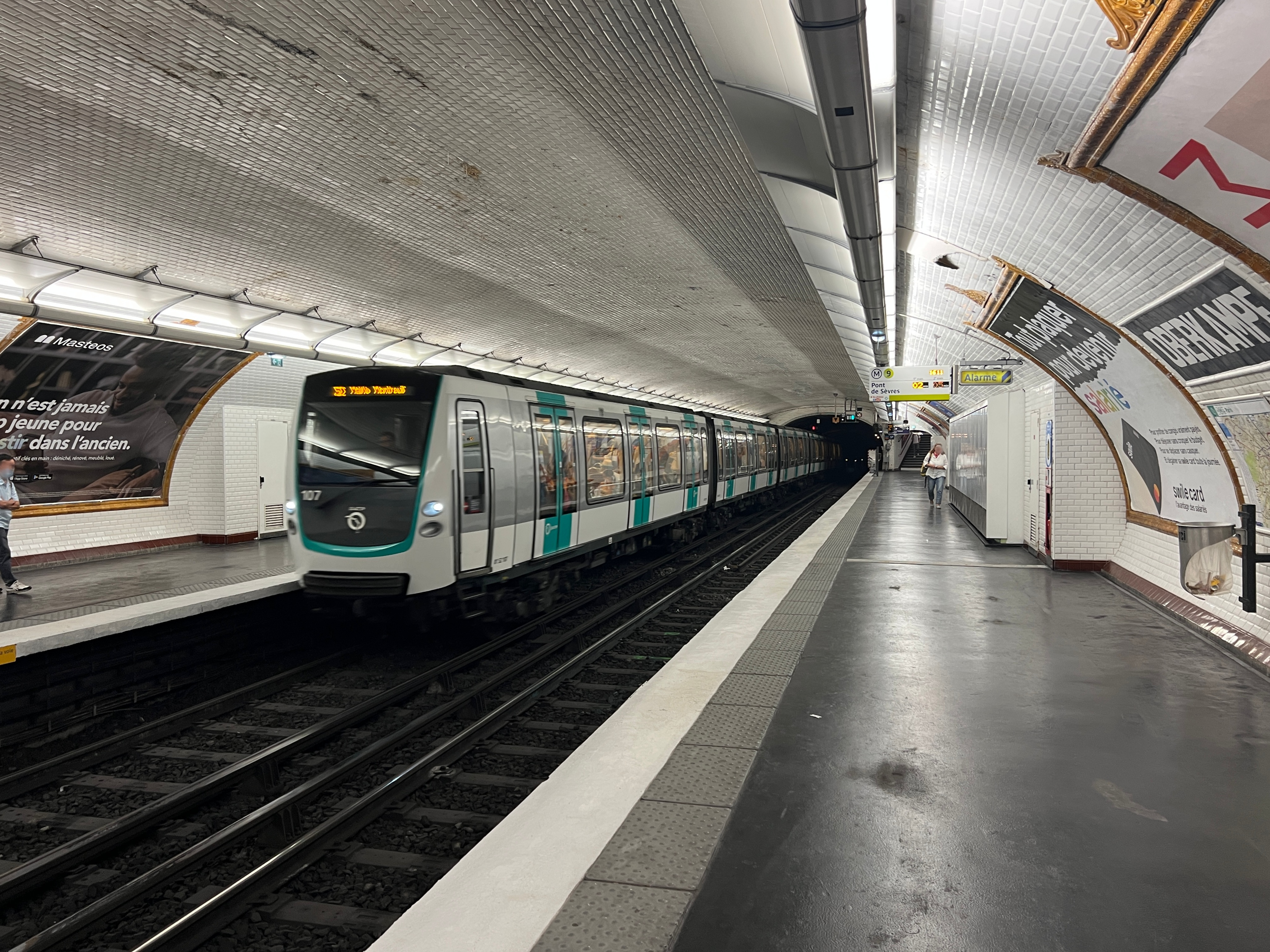
- Line 9 platforms at Oberkampf

General information
- Location: 20, rue de Crussol; 18, boul. Voltaire; 19, boul. Voltaire; 43, boul. Voltaire; 11th arrondissement of Paris; Île-de-France; France
- Coordinates: 48°51′49″N 2°22′13″E
- Owner: RATP
- Operator: RATP

Other information
- Fare zone: 1

History
- Opened: 17 December 1906

Services
Preceding station	Paris Metro	Following station
Richard-Lenoir towards Place d'Italie	Line 5	République towards Bobigny–Pablo Picasso
République towards Pont de Sèvres	Line 9	Saint-Ambroise towards Mairie de Montreuil
Location
- Location within Paris

Oberkampf (French pronunciation: [ɔbɛʁkɑ̃f]) is a station of the Paris Métro, serving Lines 5 and 9 and located in the 11th arrondissement of Paris.

== History ==
The station was opened on 15 January 1907, a month after the opening of the extension of Line 5 from Quai de la Rapée to Lancry (now called Jacques Bonsergent) on 17 December 1906. The Line 9 platforms were opened on 10 December 1933 with the extension of the line from Richelieu–Drouot to Porte de Montreuil. The name refers to Rue Oberkampf, named for Christophe-Philippe Oberkampf, an 18th-century German-born French industrialist.

== Service for travellers ==
=== Access ===
The station has four accesses, all of which consist of fixed stairs:

- access 1 – Boulevard Voltaire – Cirque d'Hiver, adorned with a Dervaux candelabrum, opening on Boulevard Voltaire cnr. Rue de Crussol;
- access 2 – cnr. rue Jean-Pierre-Timbaud / Boulevard Voltaire;
- access 3 – no. 19 Boulevard Voltaire close to cnr. of Rue Amelot;
- access 4 – cnr. Rue Oberkampf and no. 43 Boulevard Voltaire.

=== Station layout ===
Street Level

B1	Mezzanine for platform connection

Line 9 platforms	Side platform, doors will open on the right
Line 9 platforms	Westbound	← toward Pont de Sèvres (République)
Line 9 platforms	Eastbound	toward Mairie de Montreuil (Saint-Ambroise) →
Line 9 platforms	Side platform, doors will open on the right

Line 5 platforms	Side platform, doors will open on the right
Line 5 platforms	Southbound	← toward Place d'Italie (Richard-Lenoir)
Line 5 platforms	Northbound	toward Bobigny – Pablo Picasso (République) →
Line 5 platforms	Side platform, doors will open on the right

- Notes: The two République-bound tracks run in the same direction on the same level, and the line 5 and line 9 platforms are offset.

=== Platforms ===
The platforms for the two lines are of standard configuration, two at each stop point, separated by the metro tracks in the centre and the arch is elliptical.

Line 5 is decorated in the style used for most metro stations: the lighting strips are white and rounded in the Gaudin style of the 2000s Metro revival, and white bevelled ceramic tiles cover walls, tunnel exits, and outlets in the corridors. The vault is coated and painted white. The advertising frames are in a white ceramic and the name of the station is written in Parisine typeface on enamelled plates. The seats are Akiko style yellow.

The platforms of line 9 are arranged in a similar style. The lighting strips are of the same model, and the white ceramic tiles cover the walls, the tunnel exits as well as the outlets of the corridors, but also the vault. In contrast, the advertising frames are in a faience honey colour and the name of the station is also faience, in the original CMP style. The seats are Motte style orange.

=== Bus connections ===
The station is served by lines 56 and 96 of the RATP Bus Network; and, at night, by the lines N01 (inner circular starting from the Gare de l'Est) and N02 (circular outside starting from the Gare Montparnasse) of the Noctilien bus network.

== Nearby ==
- Rue Oberkampf: popular and well served, it enjoys a liveliness popular with Parisians.
- Bataclan Theater

== Gallery ==
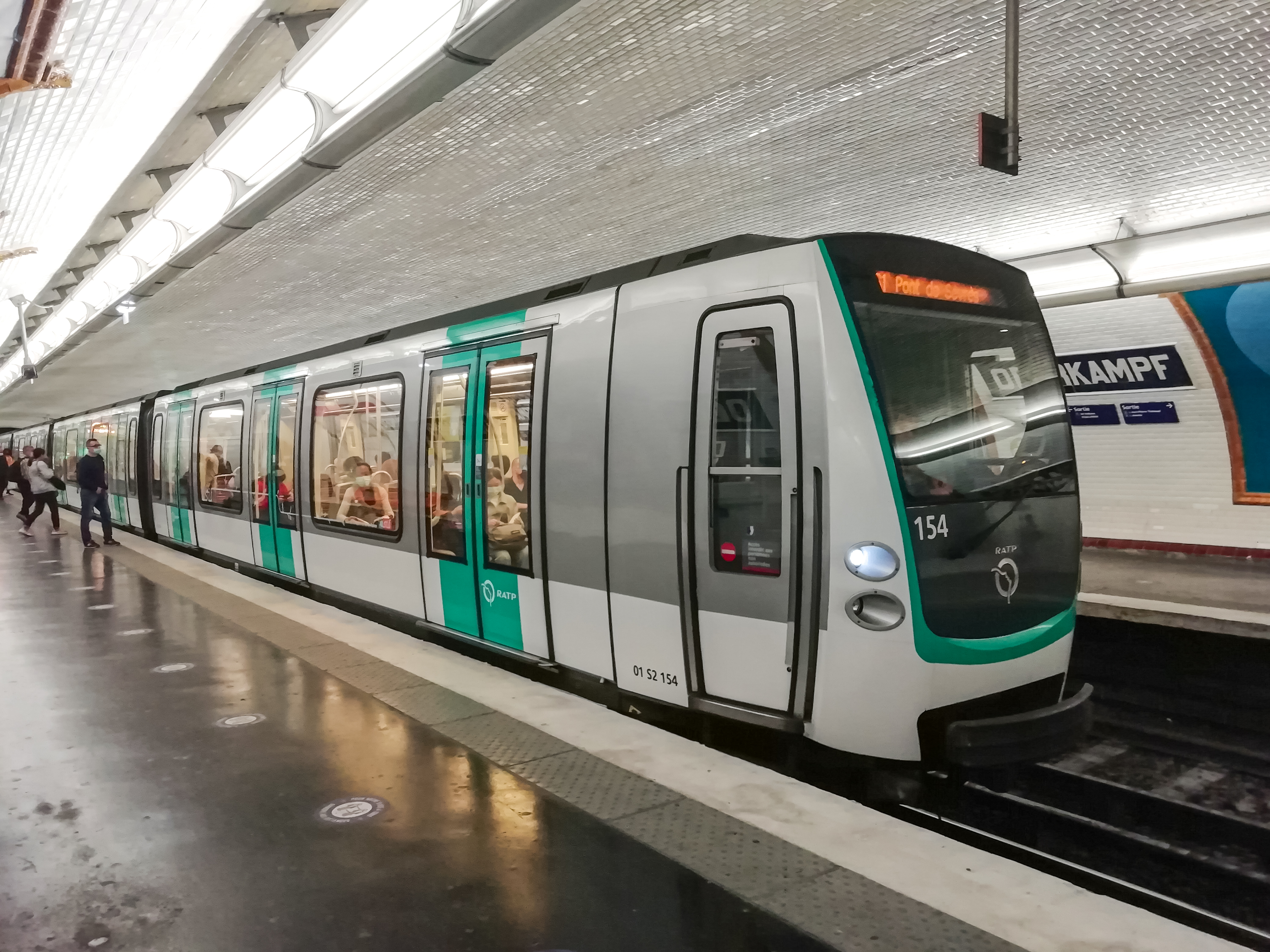
Line 9 platform station – MF 01 rolling stock at Oberkampf in 2021

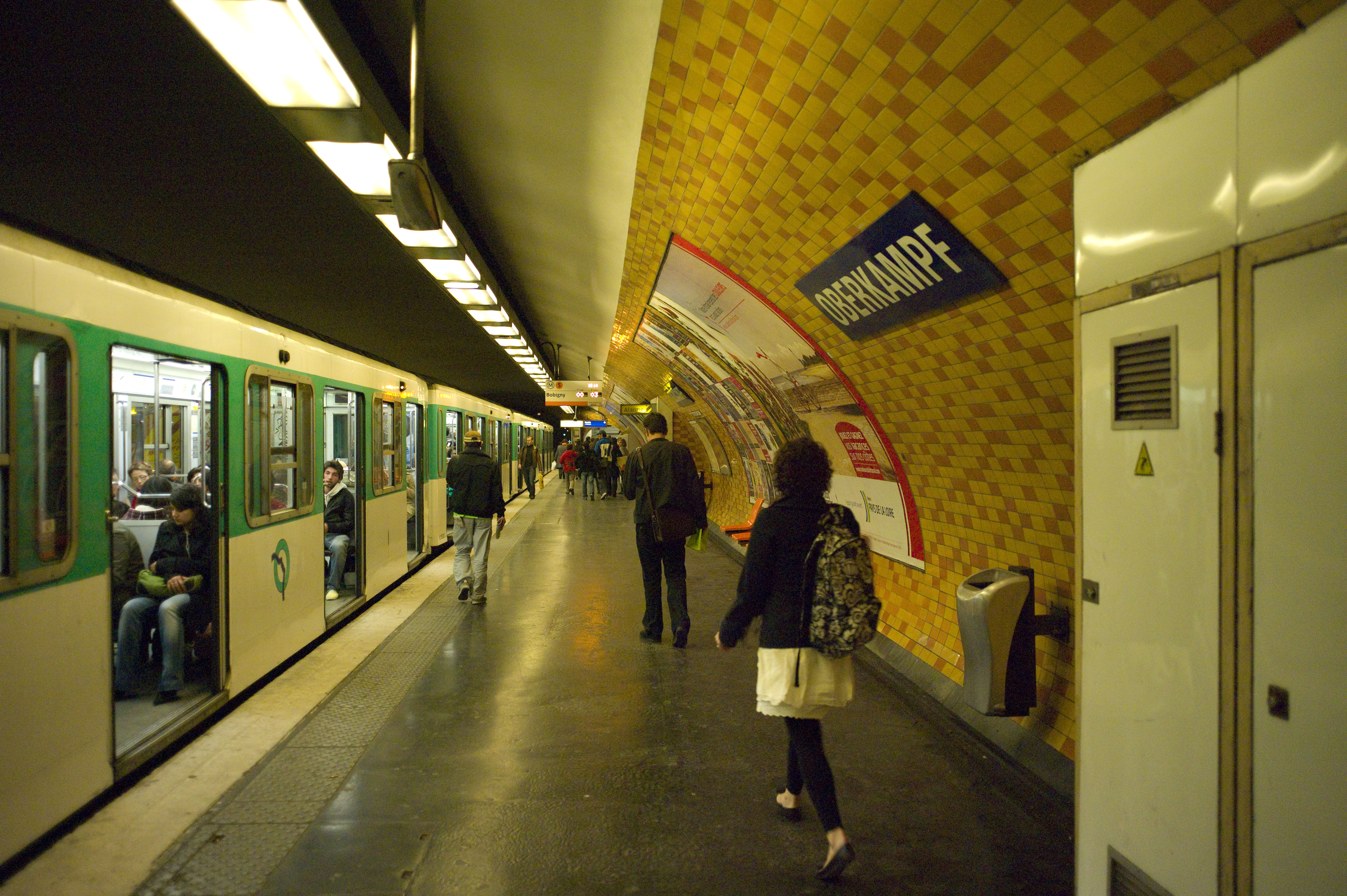
Line 5 platform station

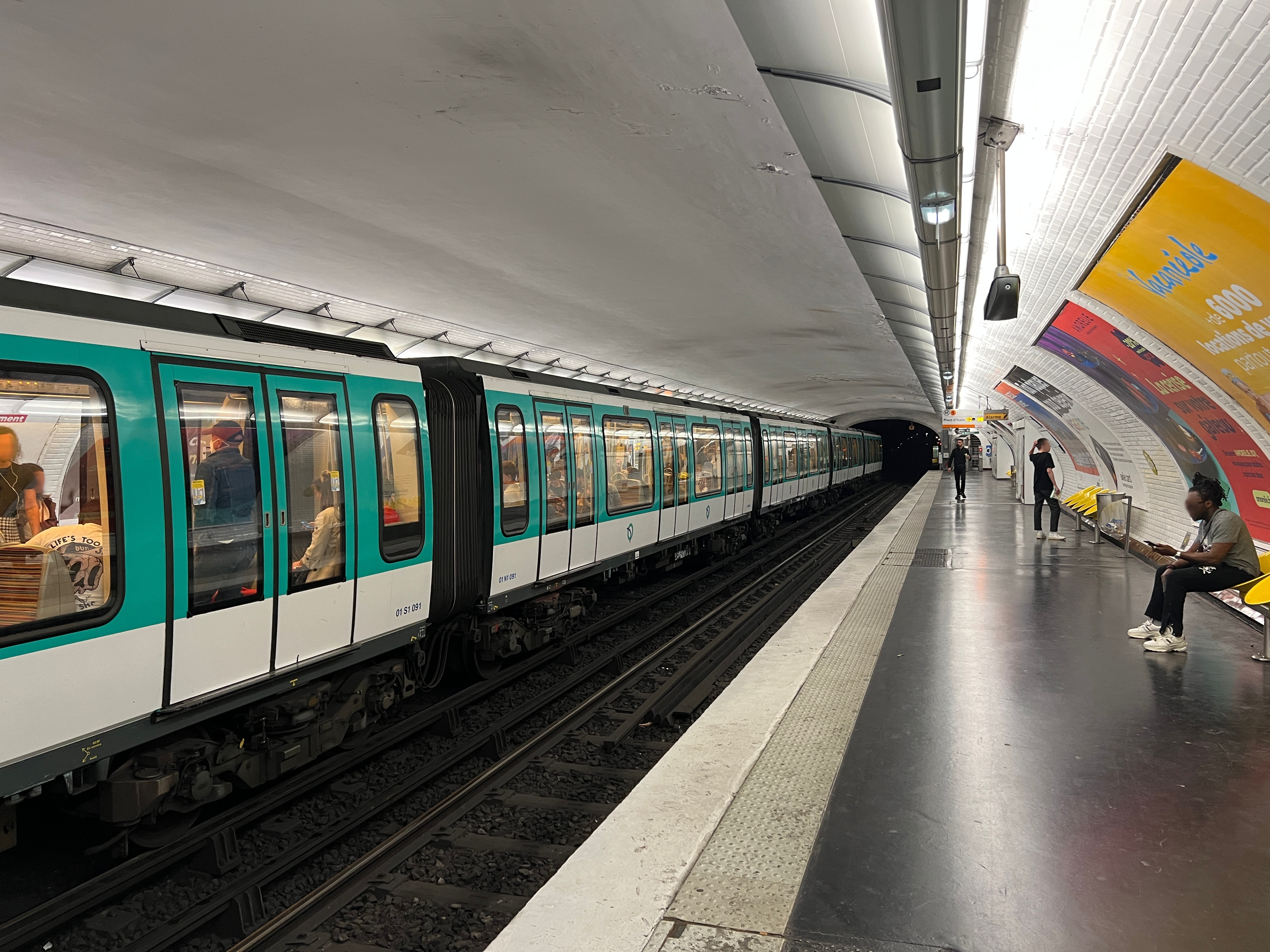
MF 01 rolling stock on Line 5
