= Marie-Catherine de Maraise =

French businesswoman

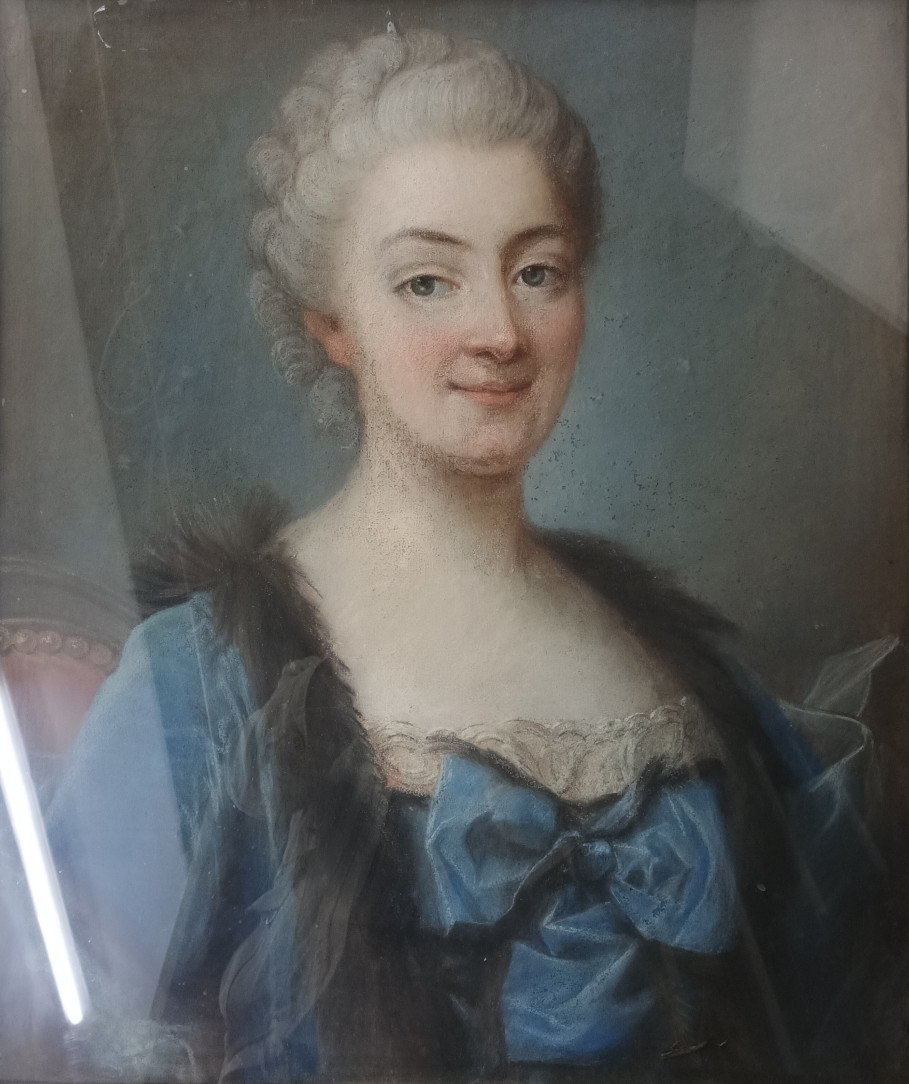
Pastel portrait of Marie Catherine Renée Darcel, wife of Joseph Alexandre Sarrasin de Maraise, 1764

Marie-Catherine de Maraise née Darcel (1737–1822) was a French businesswoman.

She married the rich Parisian investor Alexandre Sarrasin de Maraise in 1767. Her spouse was the business partner of the pioneer industrialist Christophe-Philippe Oberkampf, founder of the royal manufacture of printed cotton in France. Her husband lacked knowledge of business details and allowed her to represent his interests in the business, and with his permission, she managed the company in collaboration with Oberkampf. This was an epoch when married women where legally minors under the guardianship of their husbands, but she was allowed to do so because of her husband's support. This made Marie-Catherine de Maraise uncommon in her position of a married businesswoman in large business enterprise.

She is described as a talented woman with a keen business sense. She was essentially active as the company's accountant, responsible for its economy and for managing its contacts with authorities and business contacts, acting as the public face of the company, particularly as Oberkampf was a Protestant which made it impossible for him to be seen in certain ceremonial situations in public. With her sense of economy, she reportedly played an important part in making the firm the second most successful in France, and she acquired many valuable business contacts through her social life, among them Suzanne Curchod.

It is noted that she found out that France was going to participate in the American Revolutionary War beforehand through her contacts and used the information to try to secure an army contract for the company. In 1789, Oberkampf ended the companionship with her husband, which automatically also ended her involvement in the firm.
