= Christophe-Philippe Oberkampf =

French naturalized German industrialist

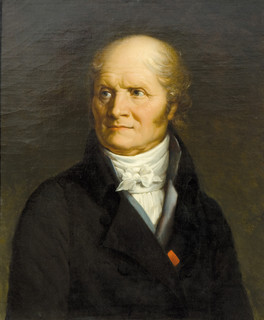
Christophe-Philippe Oberkampf

Christophe-Philippe Oberkampf (11 June 1738 – 6 October 1815) was a French naturalized German industrialist. He became famous for founding the royal manufacture of printed cottons of Jouy-en-Josas where the toile de Jouy was manufactured.

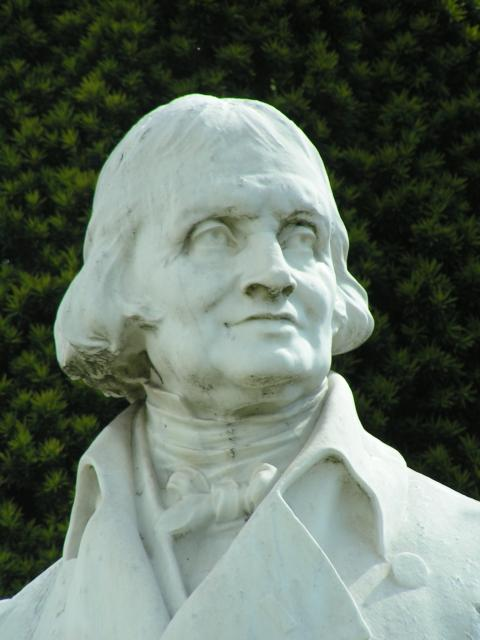
Bust of Oberkampf in the garden of the town hall of Jouy-in-Josas

Oberkampf was born in Wiesenbach, Germany, into a family of dyers. He traveled to educate himself and initially worked in Mulhouse as an engraver, then from October 1758 in Paris as a colourist.

== Career ==
=== 18th century ===
==== 1759–1770s ====
In 1759, Oberkampf proposed a partnership with the Swiss for the creation of a manufacture of cottons printed with engraved wood boards in Jouy-in-Josas. The first fabrics were successfully printed in May 1760. In 1764, Oberkampf increased his factory to a vast area of 18,000 m². The number of employees grew quickly and reached 900 workmen in 1774.

In 1770, Oberkampf who had then lived in France for ten years, was made a naturalised French citizen, along with his brother. Around this period, an important technical evolution enabled his company to considerably increase its production: the wooden boards were replaced with copper plates, also engraved, but flexible and able to be fixed on cylindrical drums. The company entered the era of mechanisation.

Until 1789, he was the business partner of Alexandre Sarrasin de Maraise, whose wife Marie-Catherine de Maraise took care of his interests and had an able companionship with Christophe-Philippe Oberkampf.

==== 1780s–1790s ====
In 1783, the factory received from king Louis XVI the title of "royal manufacturer" and in 1787, Oberkampf received from the king the title of squire as well as the right to use arms and his device "Recte et vigilanter (uprightness and vigilance)".

In 1785 Oberkampf invented the first machine for printing wallpaper, and shortly afterwards, Louis-Nicolas Robert designed a process for manufacturing endless rolls of wall-paper.

On 7 February 1790 the reforms of the French Revolution led him to be appointed mayor of Jouy-en-Josas. In 1794 his daughter Émilie was born. Influenced by the British Infant Schools, she would become the pioneer of the nursery school.

The factory continued to flourish during the Revolution and became the second company of the kingdom after the mirror manufacture of Saint-Gobain. In 1799, sales declined and the manpower – which had reached 2,000 workers – was reduced.

=== 19th century ===
In 1806, Oberkampf won a gold medal at the industrial fair of the Louvre for its eminent role in the manufacture of printed toiles. On 20 June 1806, after visiting the workshops, Napoleon, awarded him the legion of honor.

Decrease in the demand and competition got more insistent. In 1815, manpower fell to 435, and the manufacture was closed during the invasion of the armies united against the Emperor.

== Death and legacy ==
When Oberkampf died in 1815 in Jouy-en-Josas (today in Yvelines), his son Emile succeeded him as the head of the company. Taken over by Jacques-Juste Barbet de Jouy in 1822, it finally went bankrupt in 1843. Oberkampf was buried in the garden of his house, which today houses the Music Academy of Jouy-in-Josas.

Oberkampf's name was given to a Rue Oberkampf in the 11th arrondissement of Paris, and to the Oberkampf metro station that serves it.

== Read also ==
- Stanley D Chapman; Serge Chassagne; European textile printers in the eighteenth century : a study of Peel and Oberkampf; London : Heinemann Educational : Pasold Fund, 1981. OCLC 8500406
- Josette Brédif; Musée Oberkampf; Christophe-Philippe Oberkampf et le manufacture de Jouy-en-Josas : historique.; Jouy-en-Josas, France : Musée Oberkampf, 1987. OCLC 34521962
- H.Clouzot, Histoire de la manufacture de Jouy et de la toile imprimée en France; Paris, 2 vols, 1928.
