= Saint-Joseph-des-Nations =

Church in Paris, France

Coordinates: 48°52′09″N 2°22′25″E

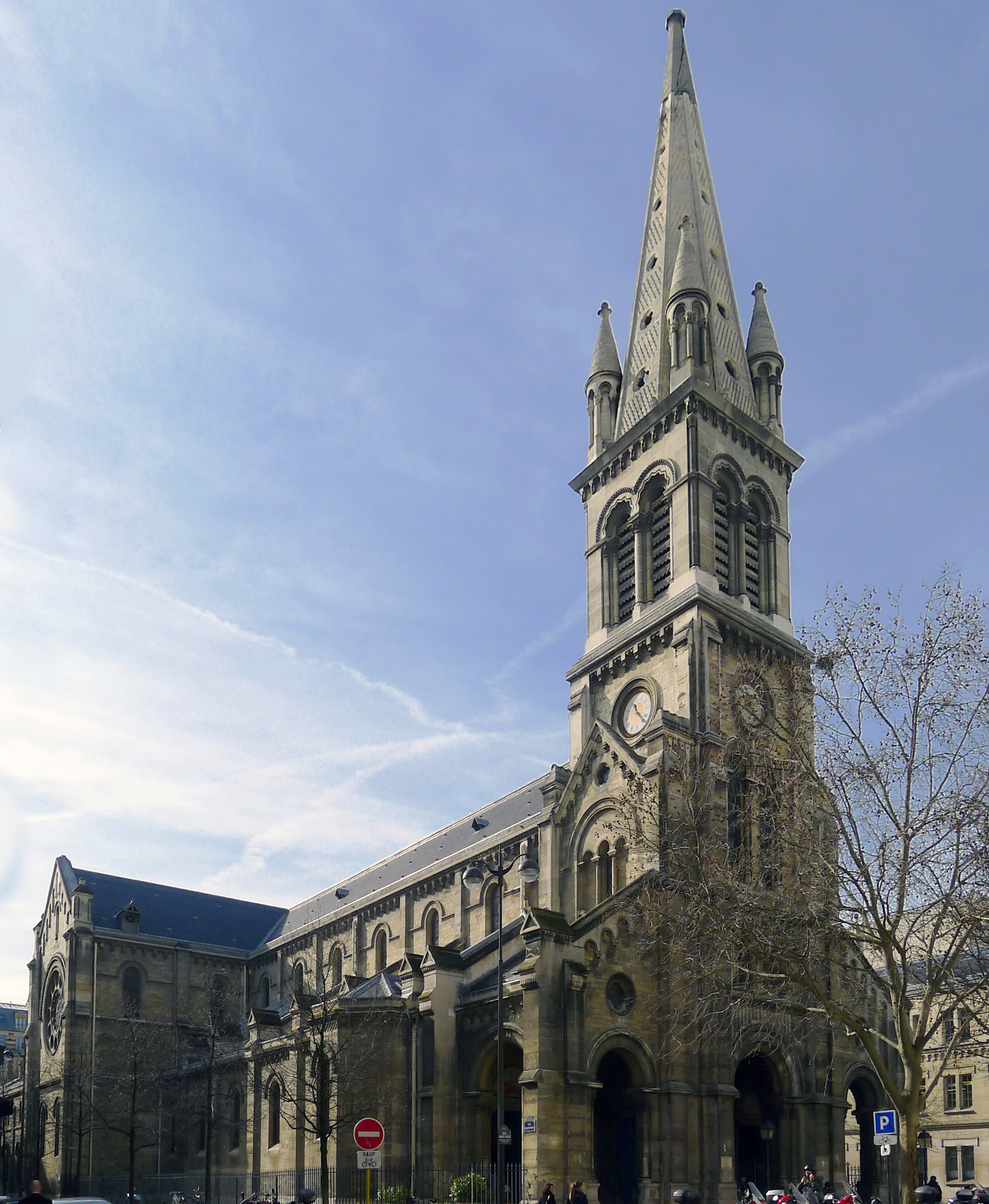
- Saint-Joseph-des-Nations

Religion
- Affiliation: Catholic Church
- Province: Archdiocese of Paris
- Rite: Roman Rite

Location
- Location: 161 rue Saint-Maur, 11th arrondissement of Paris
- Interactive map of Saint-Joseph-des-Nations

Architecture
- Style: Neo-Romanesque
- Groundbreaking: 1867
- Completed: 1874

Saint-Joseph-des-Nations is a Roman Catholic Church located at 161 rue Saint-Maur in the 11th arrondissement of Paris. It was built between 1867 and 1874 in the Neo-Romanesque style by architect Theodore Ballu. The name of the church was chosen to set it apart from the other Paris churches named for Joseph, and to denote the role of the parish as a popular destination for immigrants from around Europe.

== History ==
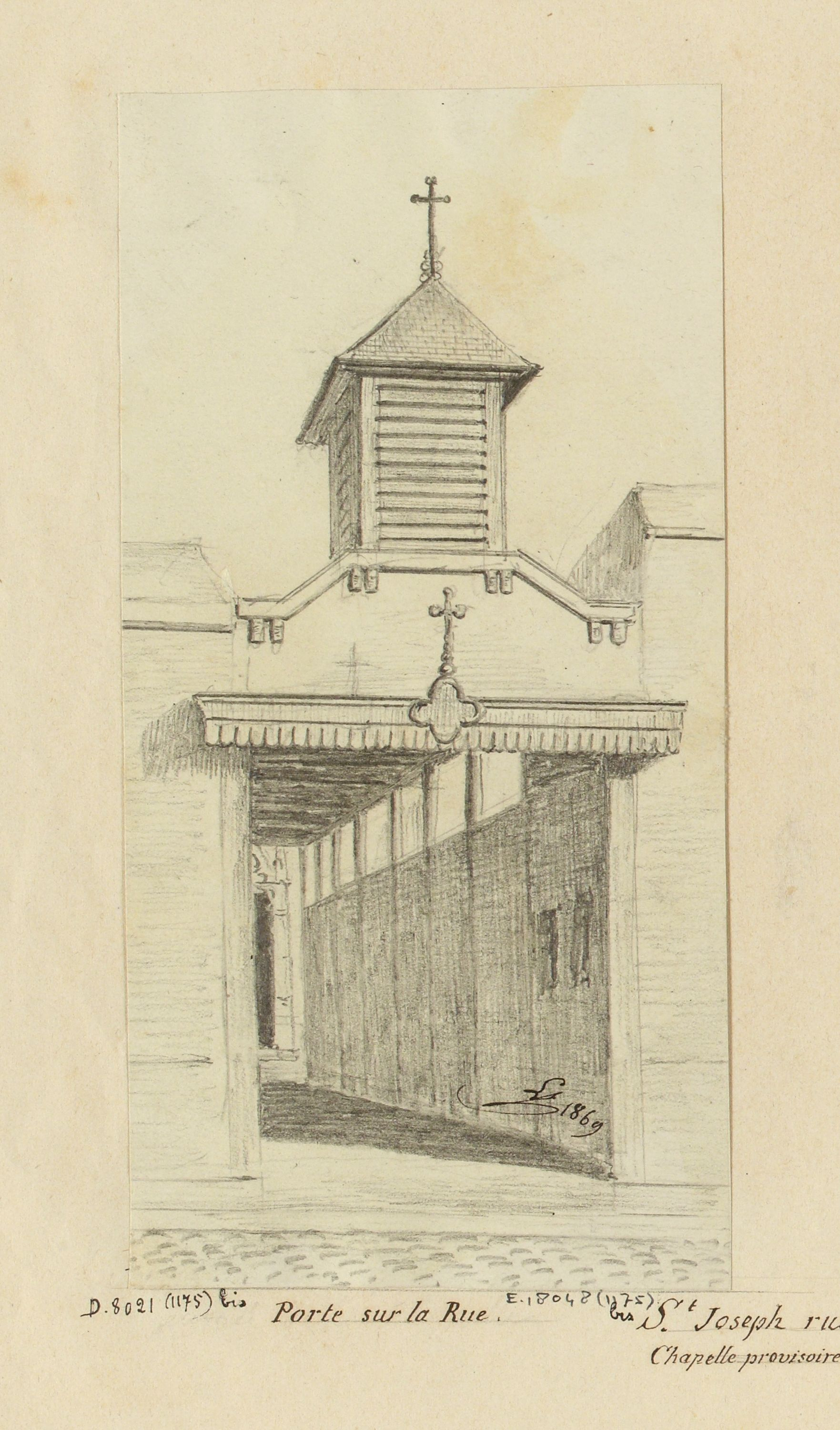
The hangar that served as the church in the 1850s and 1860s

The population of the quarter grew rapidly in the 1850s with the construction of the Ourcq Canal and the industry that accompanied it. The first church was a large hanger holding five hundred parishioners, but it was soon too small for the growing congregation.

Construction of the new church began in 1867 and continued until 1874. The new church construction was part of the great rebuilding of the center of Paris ordered by Napoleon III and carried out by Baron Haussmann. The architect Theodore Ballu was already very experienced in the grand Paris project; he had planned the rebuilding of the Paris Hotel de Ville, after it was burned by the Paris Commune. He had also built the impressive bell tower of Saint-Germain l'Auxerrois, Saint-Ambroise, the Protestant church of Saint-Esprit, and the landmark Tour Saint-Jacques. The construction of the church was delayed by the Paris Commune in 1871, but was completed afterwards in 1875. The two streets next to the church, were named for two Paris priests taken hostage and executed by the Paris Commune.

On August 30, 1899, riots broke out around the church between supporters and opponents of journalist Alfred Dreyfus, accused of espionage by the government. The riot moved from the square into the church itself, which suffered considerable damage. Dreyfus was convicted of espionage but was quickly pardoned by the French President.

The church underwent a major restoration between January 2019 and July 2021. The bell tower, which had been reconstructed in 1923, was made of stones which were held together with iron bolts The bolts had rusted, causing the stones to separate. To solve the problem, it was necessary to dismantle the bell tower stone by stone, and rebuild it with a stainless steel framework.

== Description ==
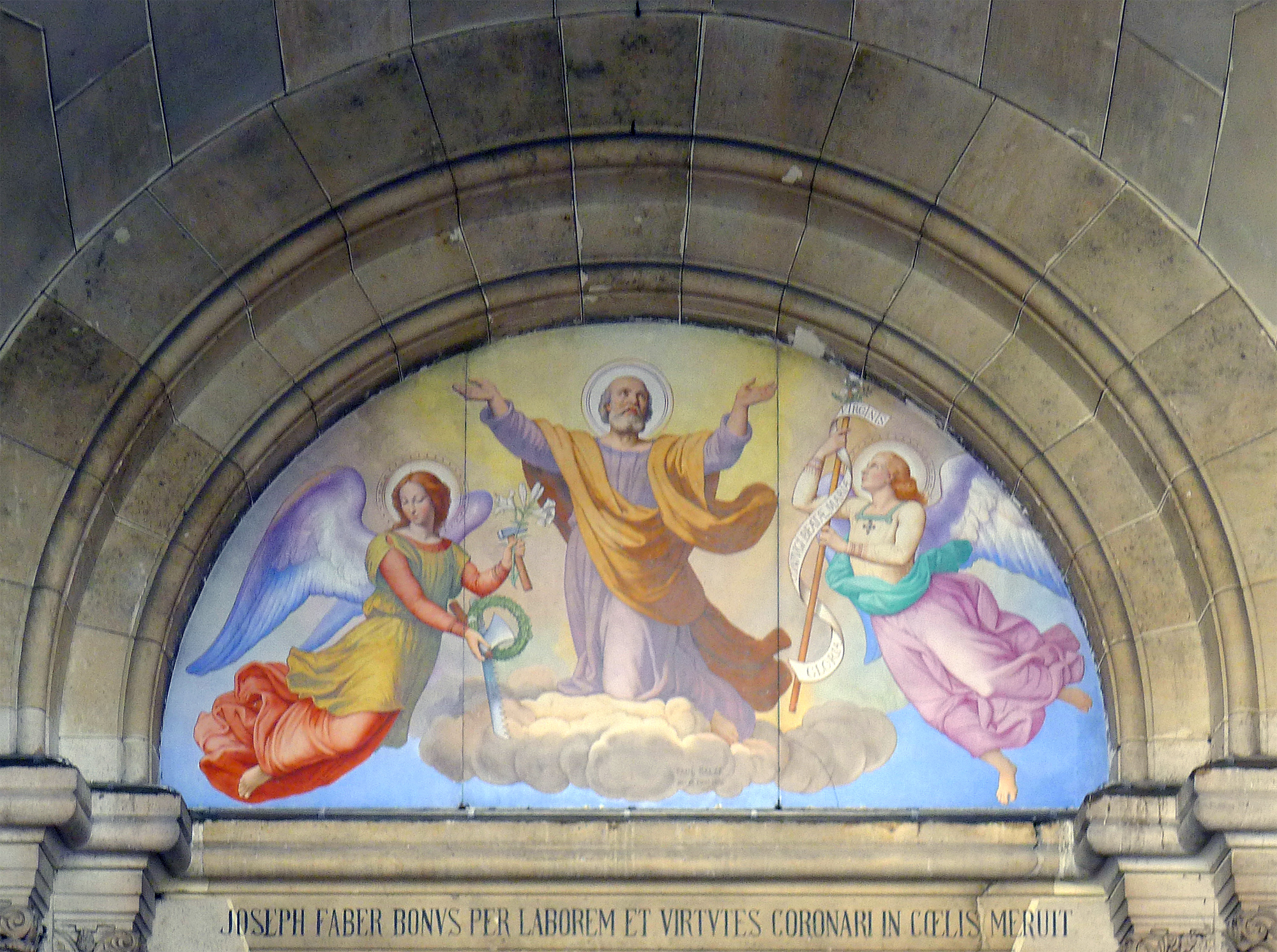
Decoration in the porch over the central portal - "Saint Joseph lifted to heaven by angels"

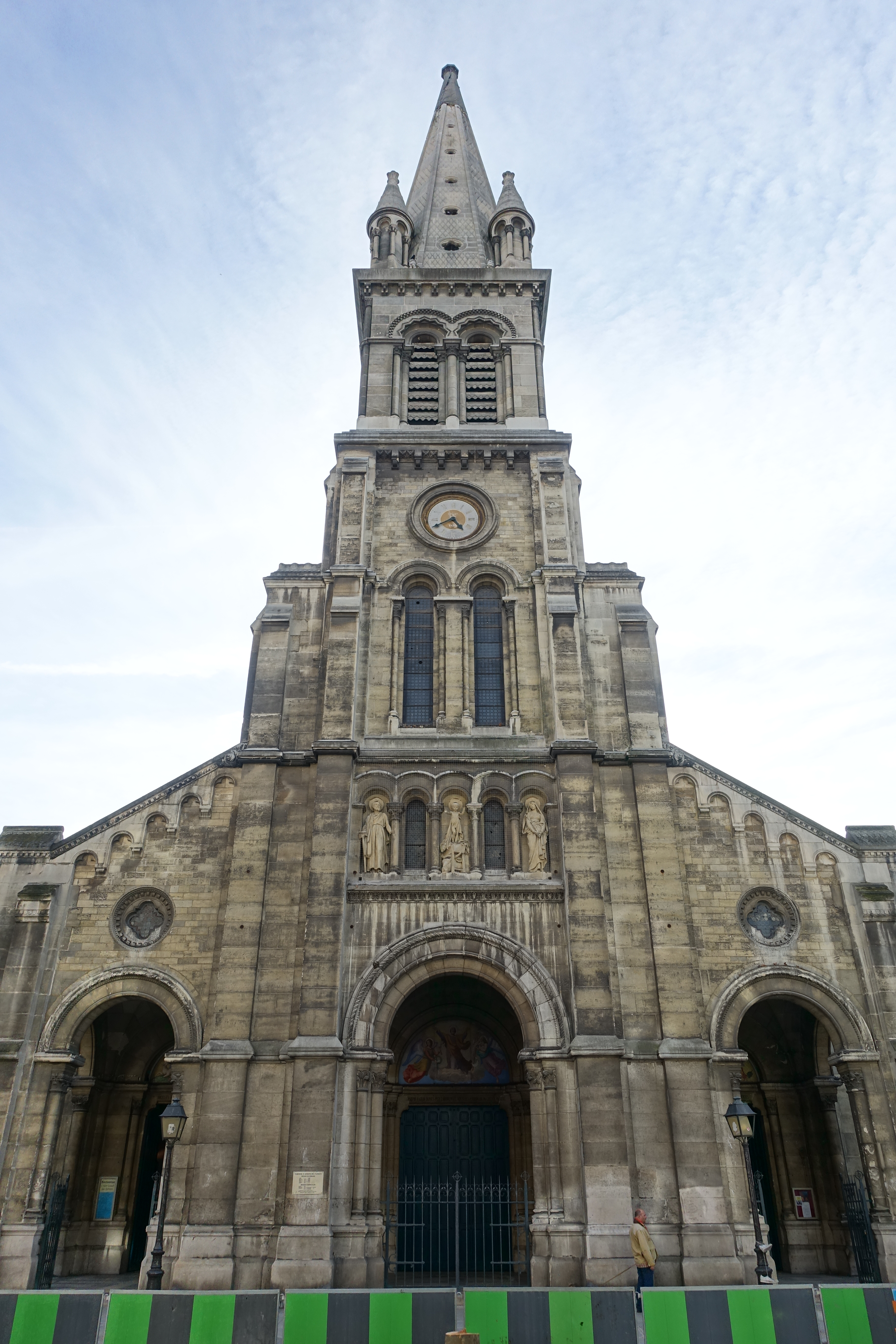
The façade and bell tower

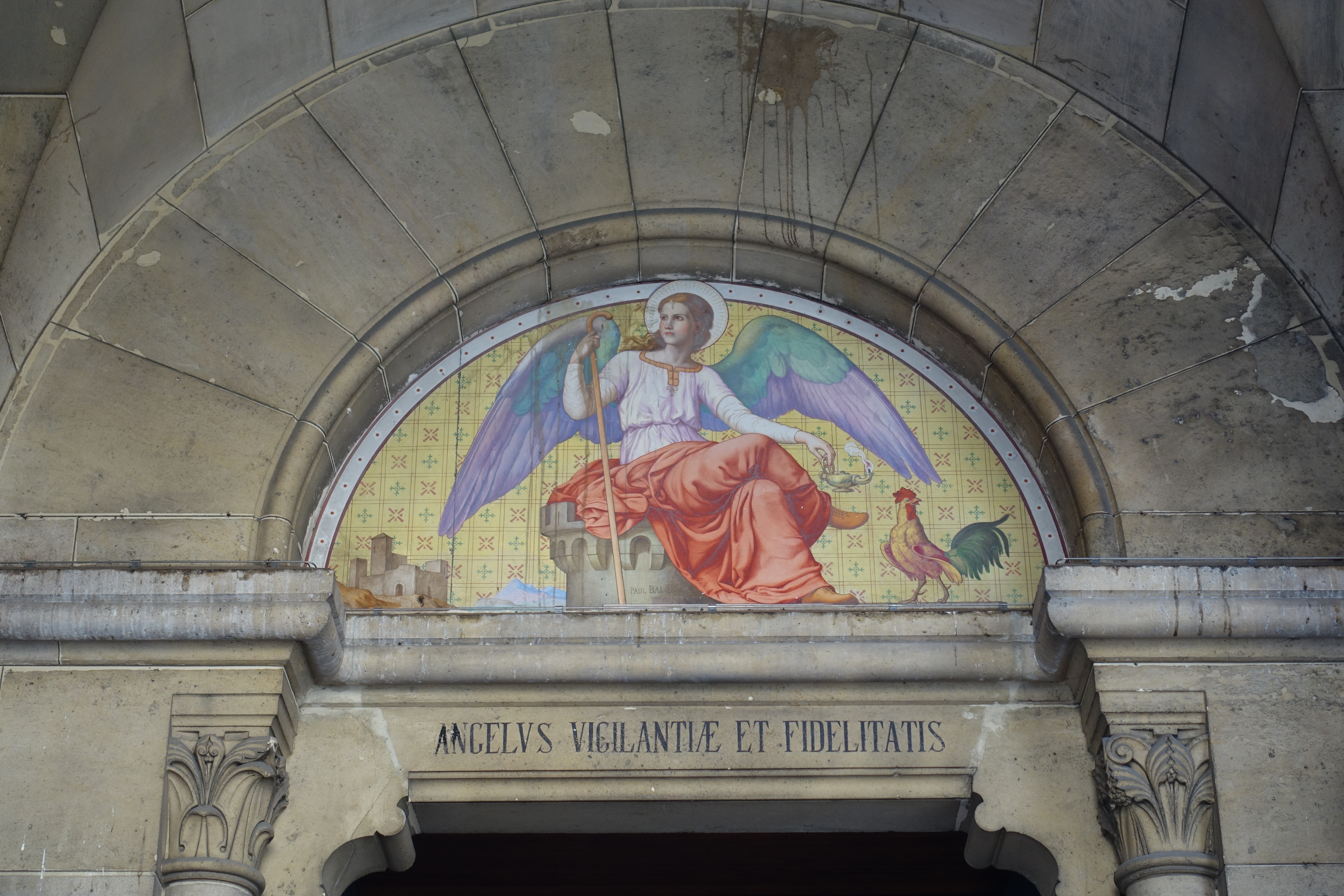
"An Angel, faithful and watchful" inside the porch

The style the building is a blend of Romanesque architecture of the 12th century with Renaissance elements, a combination very popular in Paris in the second half of the 19th century. It follows a basic basilica plan, with a principal nave flanked by two lateral aisles. There is a chapel dedicated to the Virgin Mary in the apse. In place to the two traditional towers, it has a single large flèche 60 meters high, above the porch which has three traverses. three traverses.

The bell tower was entirely rebuil in 2019-2021 with 183 tons of new grantees stones, secured with stainless steel, The original cross of gilded copper was returned to its place.

=== Interior ===
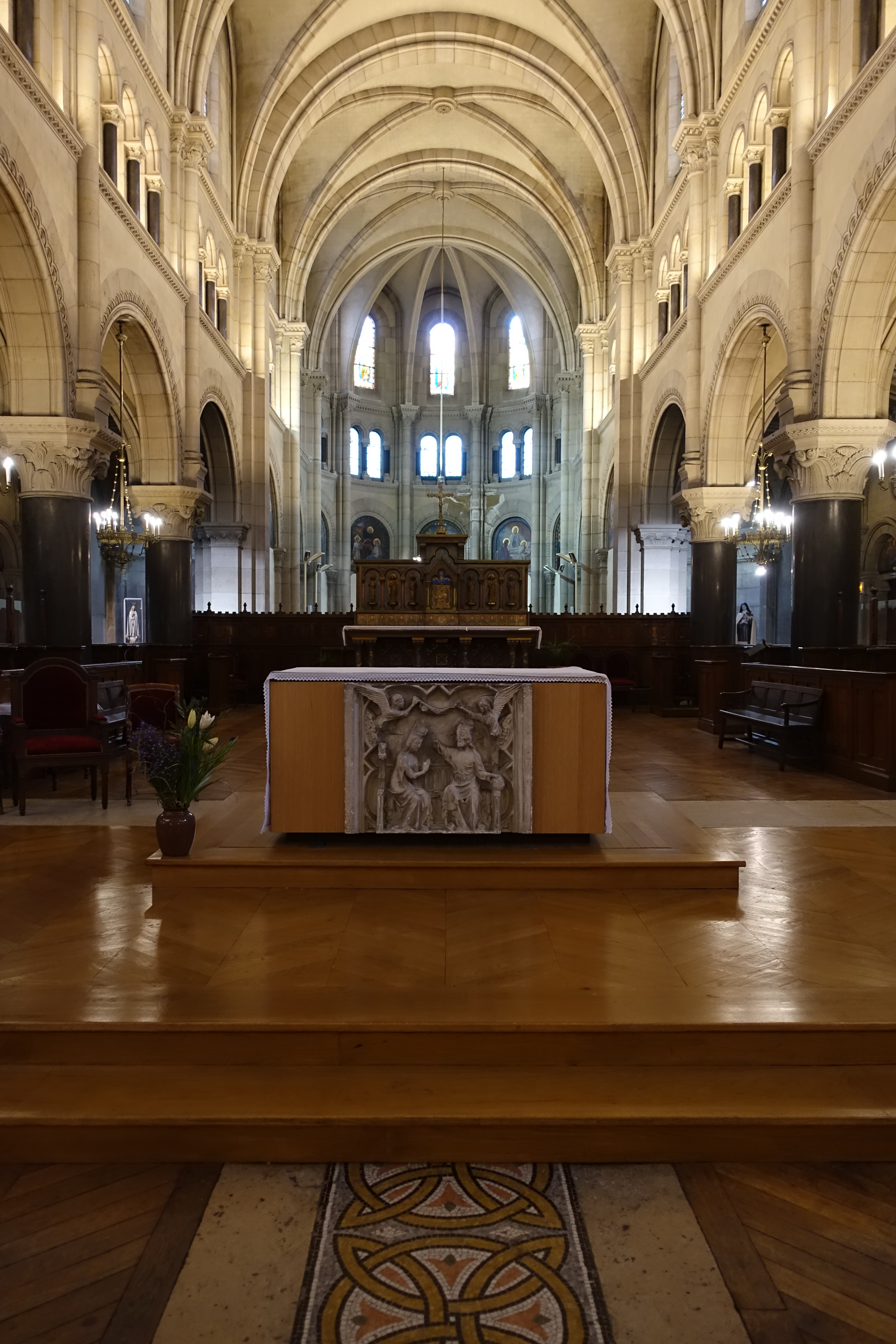
The choir and the central nave

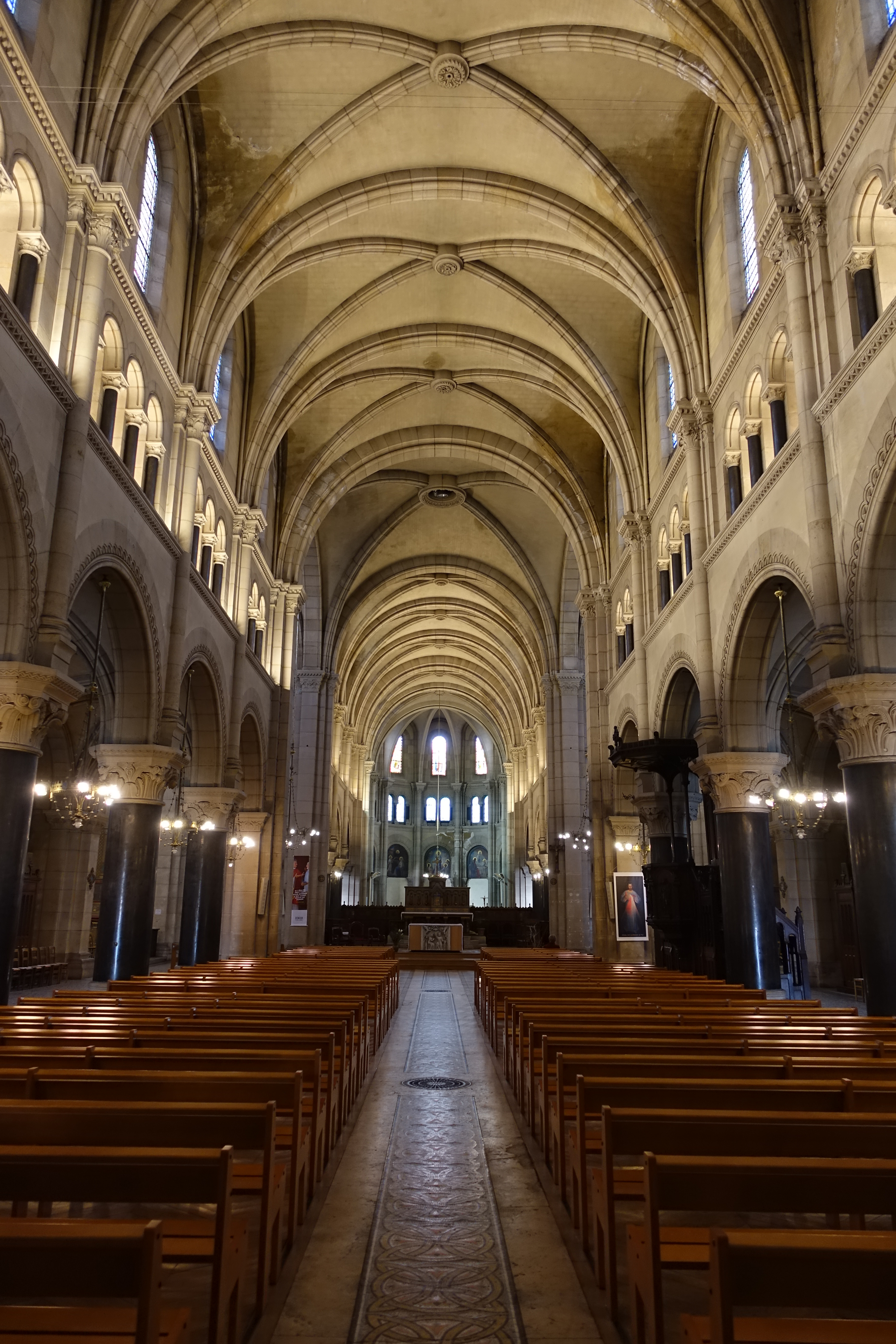
The nave facing the choir

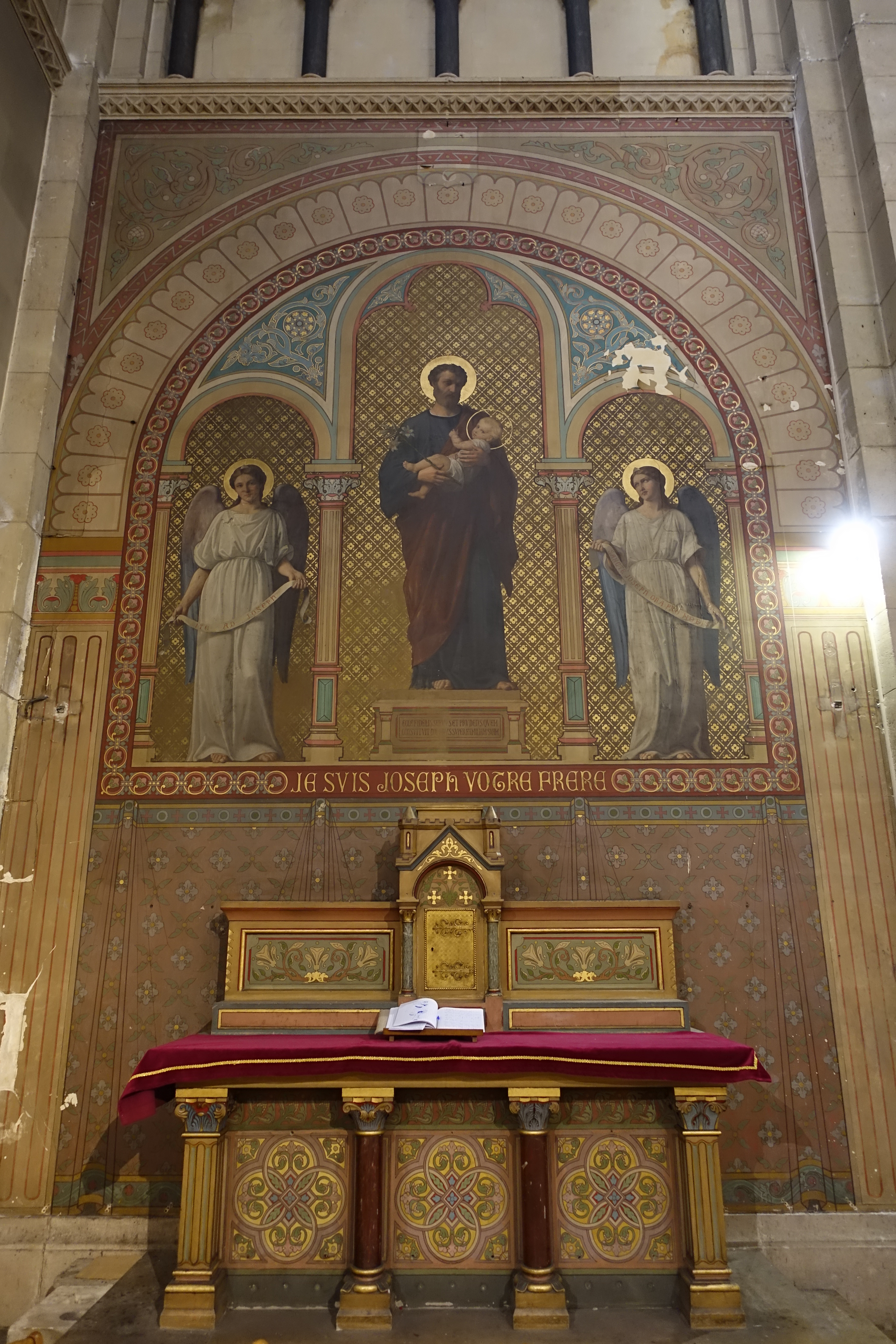
Chapel

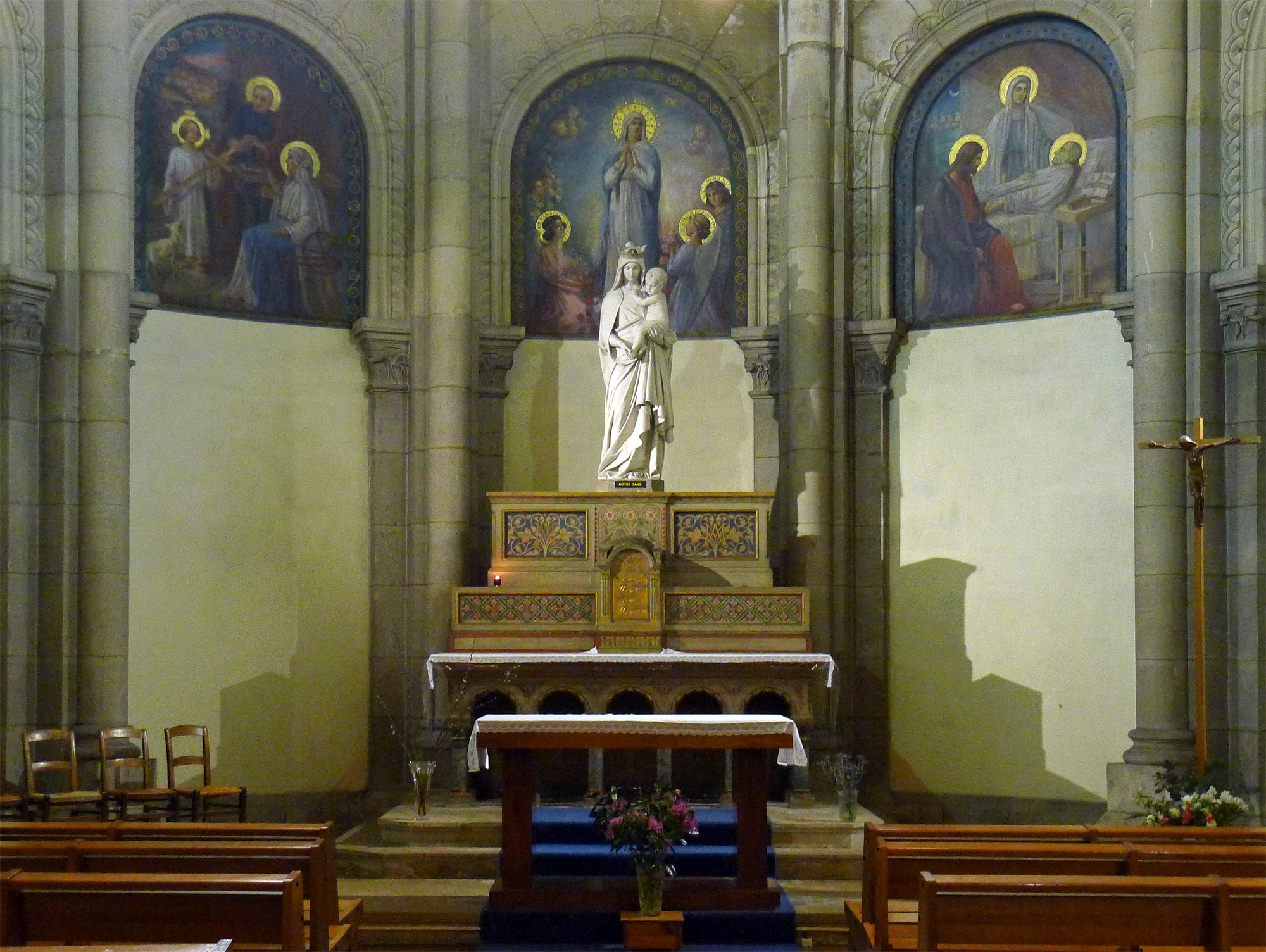
Chapel of the Virgin in the Apse

== Stained glass ==
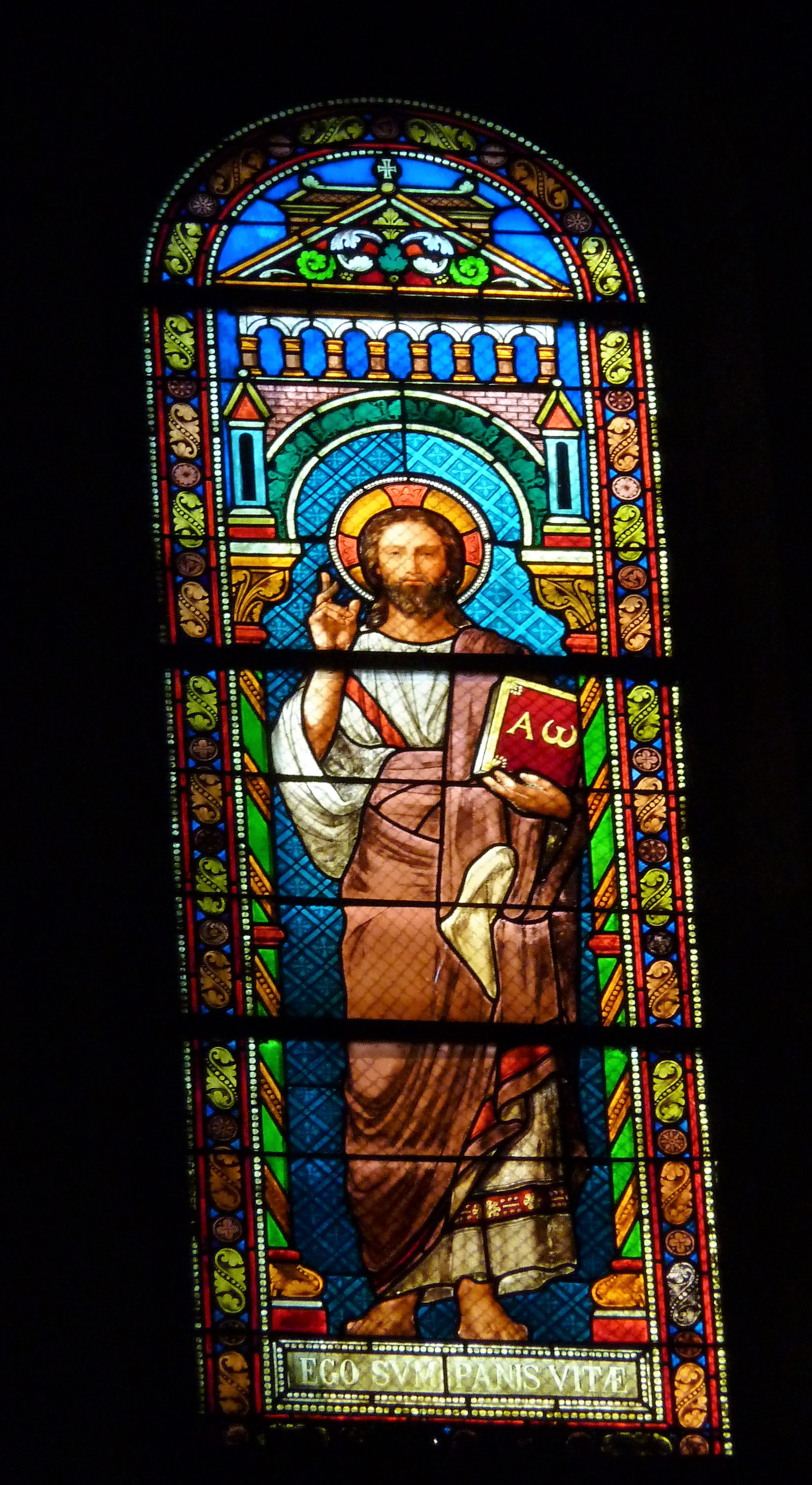
"Christ"

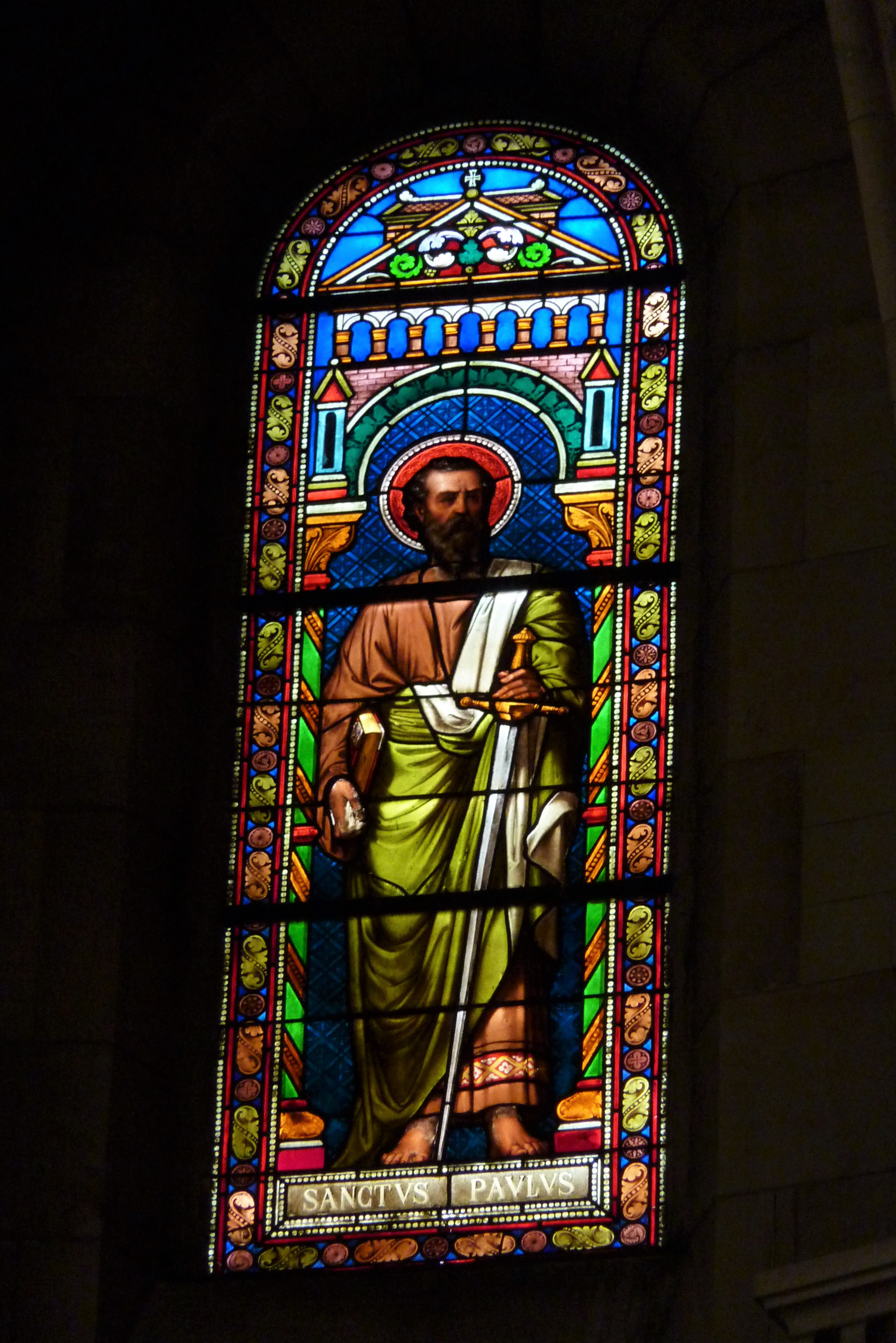
"Saint Paul"

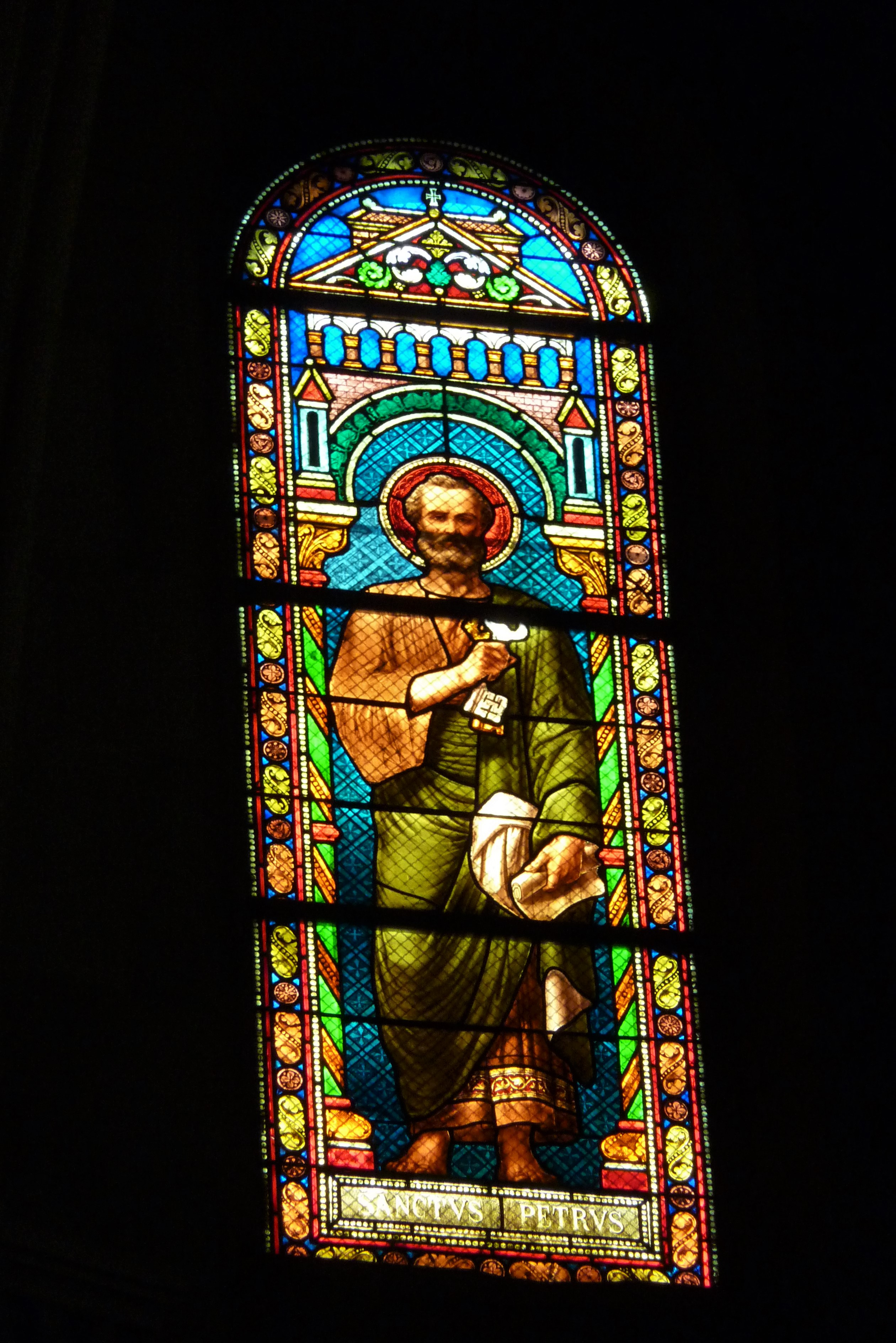
"Saint Peter"

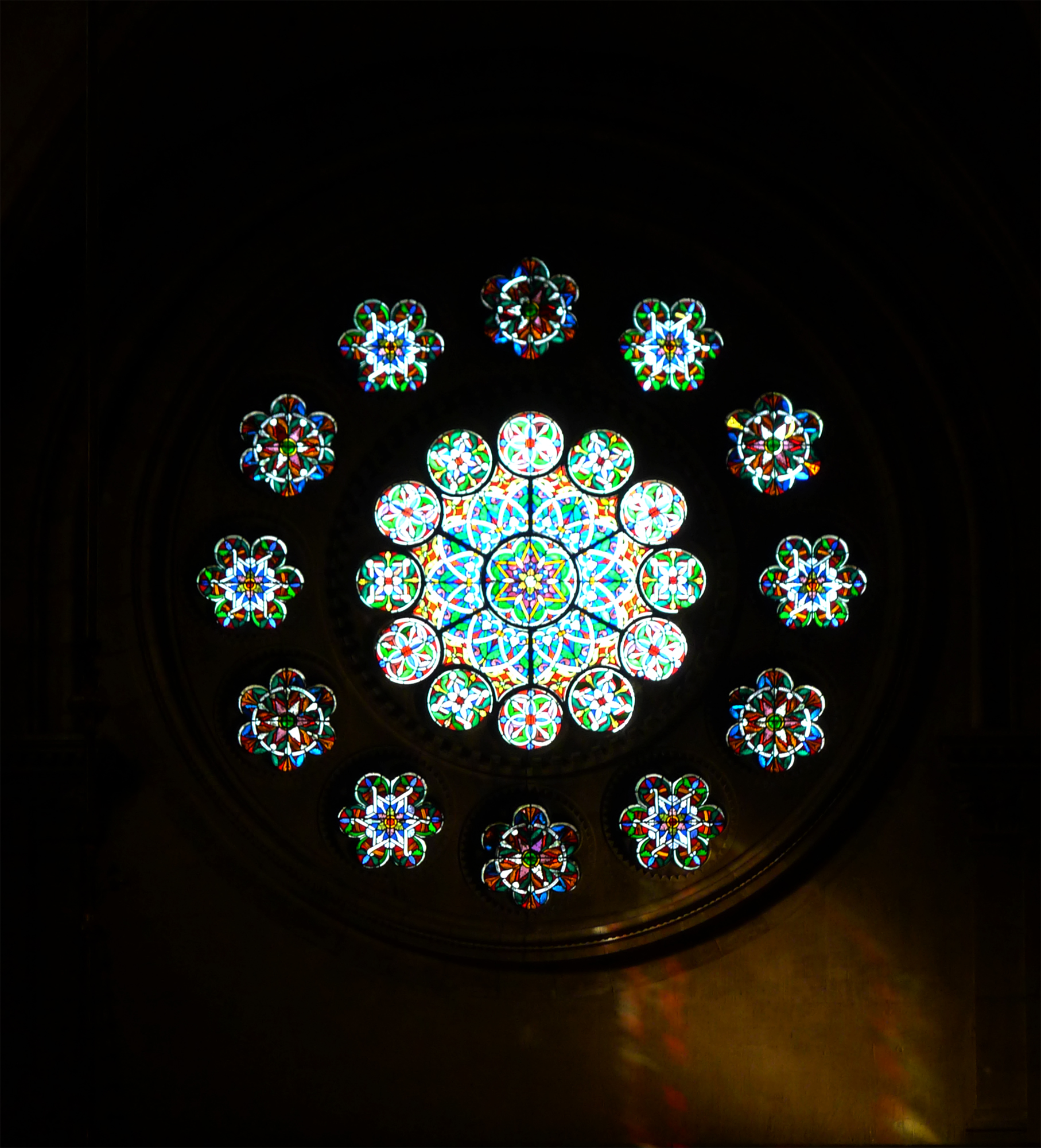
The rose window

The stained glass in church was created by Eugene Oudinot in 1868. He had studied painting with Eugène Delacroix, and his windows often resemble paintings. The windows which decorate the upper level of the apse depict Saint Peter, Christ, and Saint Paul.

== Organ ==
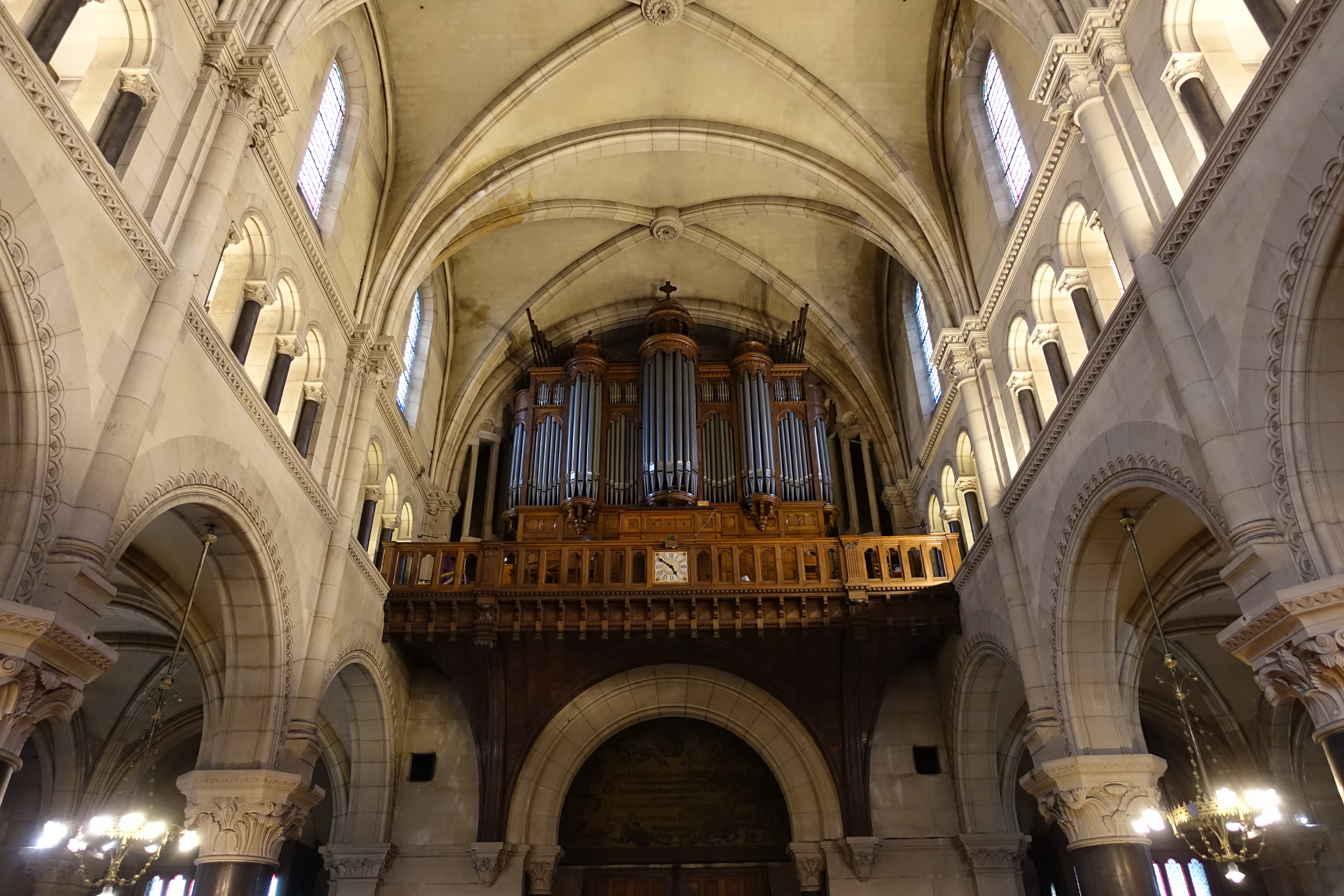
The organ in the tribune, over the portal

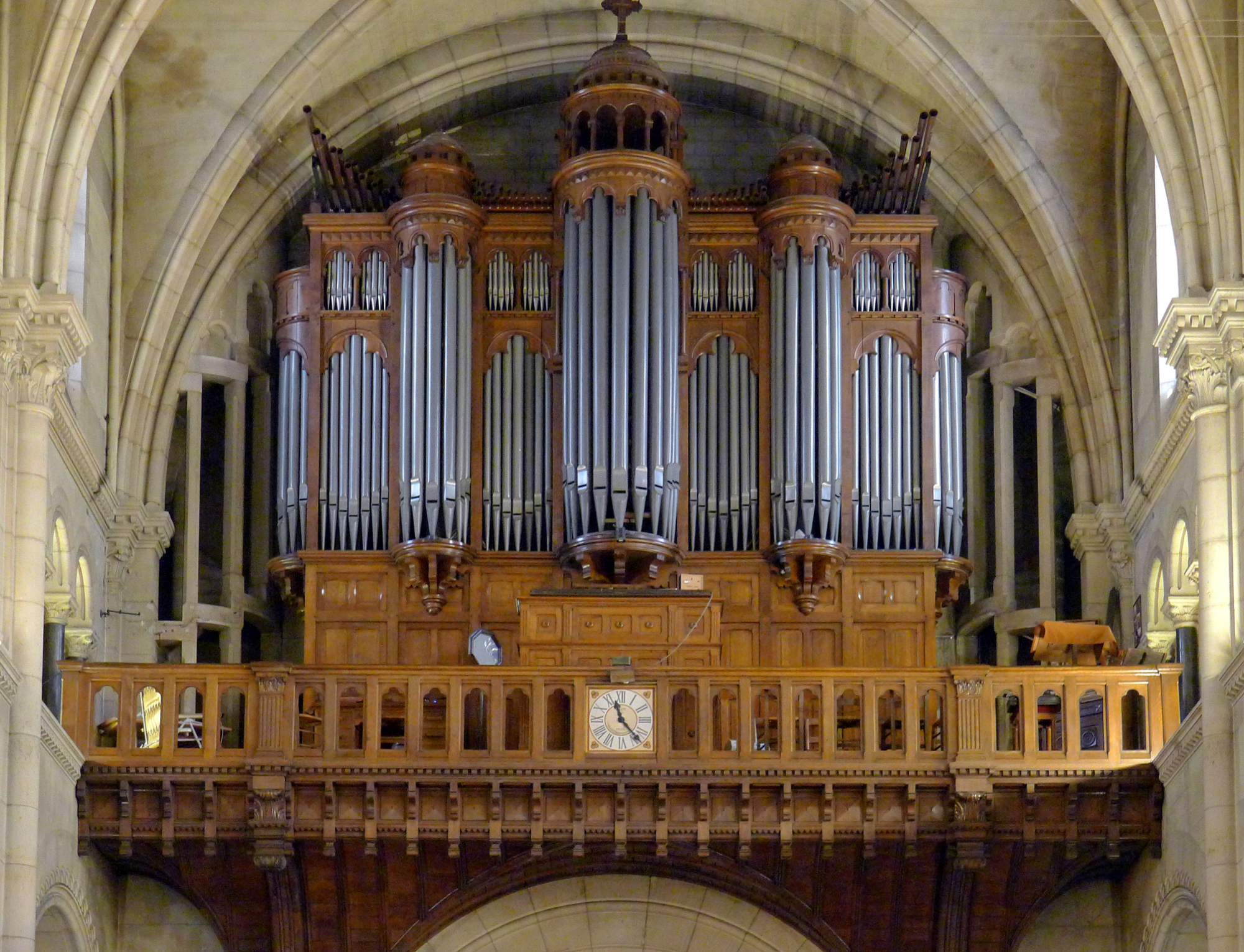
The organ *1874)

The organ in the tribune was built by the firm of Stolz and Brothers, Eduard and Eugene, in 1874. It underwent modification in 1874 and in 1863. It was electrified in 1967, and further modifications were made by Bernard Dargassies in the 1980s. The organ has thirty-two effects played on three manual keyboards and thirty pedals.
