= Rue Oberkampf =

Street in Paris, France

- Oberkampf Street
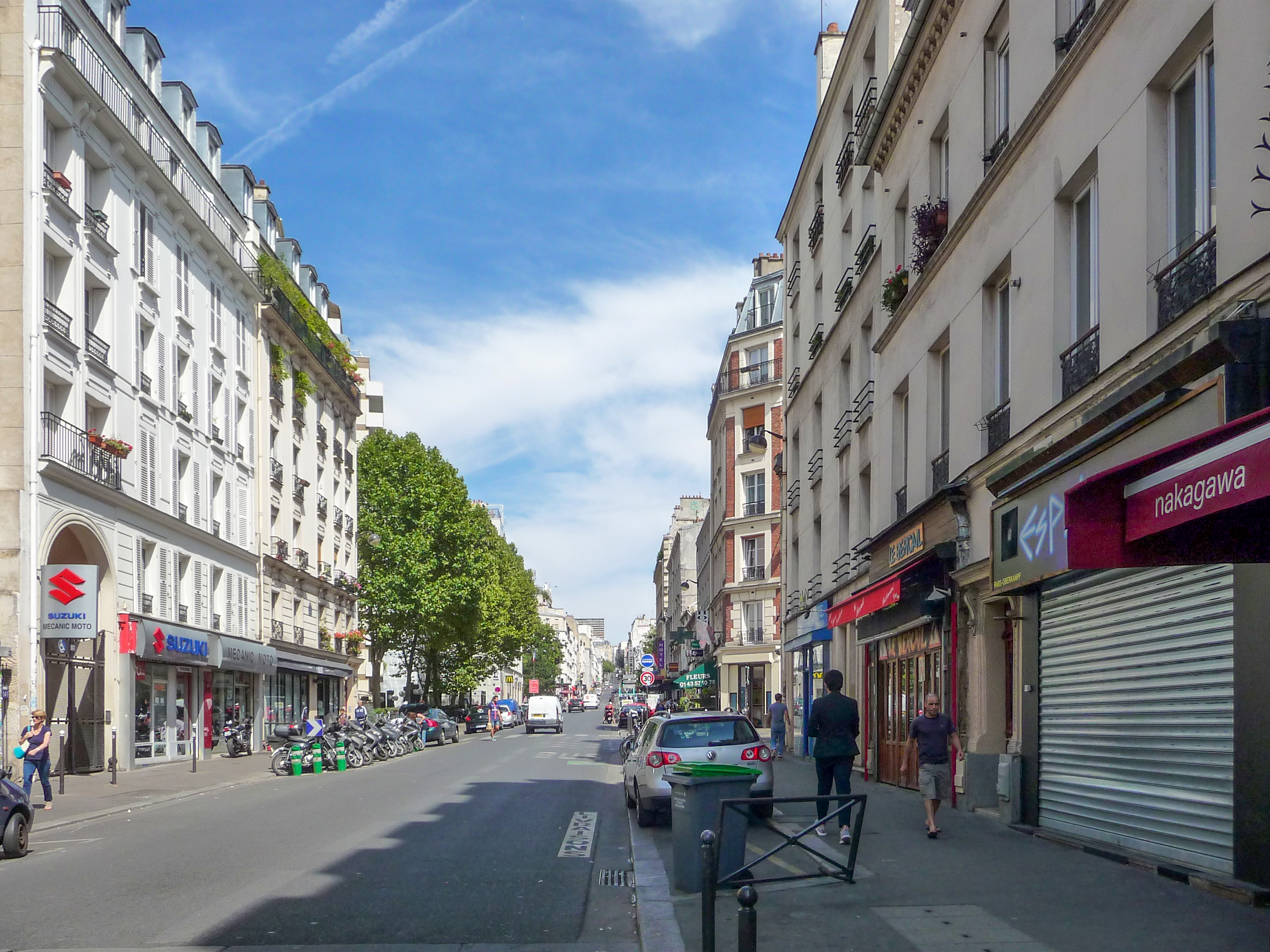
- Rue Oberkampf in 2015
- Interactive map of Rue Oberkampf
- Native name: Rue Oberkampf (French)
- Former names: rue de Ménilmontant, rue Chapus or Chapuy, rue de la Roulette, rue de la Haute Borne
- Namesake: Christophe-Philippe Oberkampf, an 18th-century Bavaria-born French industrialist
- Length: 1,230 m (4,040 ft)
- Arrondissement: 11th arrondissement
- Nearest metro station: Oberkampf (Paris Métro)
- Coordinates: 48.8654°N 2.3763°E
- From: boulevard des Filles Du Calvaire, 26 and rue Amelot, 106
- To: boulevard de Belleville, 1 and boulevard de Ménilmontant, 143

Construction
- Inauguration: August 24, 1864

Other
- Website: web.archive.org/web/20070821080243/http://www.v1.paris.fr/CARTO/nomenclature/6858.nom.html

The Rue Oberkampf (English: Oberkampf Street) is a street in the 11th arrondissement of Paris. It is named for Christophe-Philippe Oberkampf, an 18th-century Bavarian-born French industrialist.
