= 11th arrondissement of Paris =

Municipal arrondissement in Paris, Île-de-France, France

- Municipal arrondissement
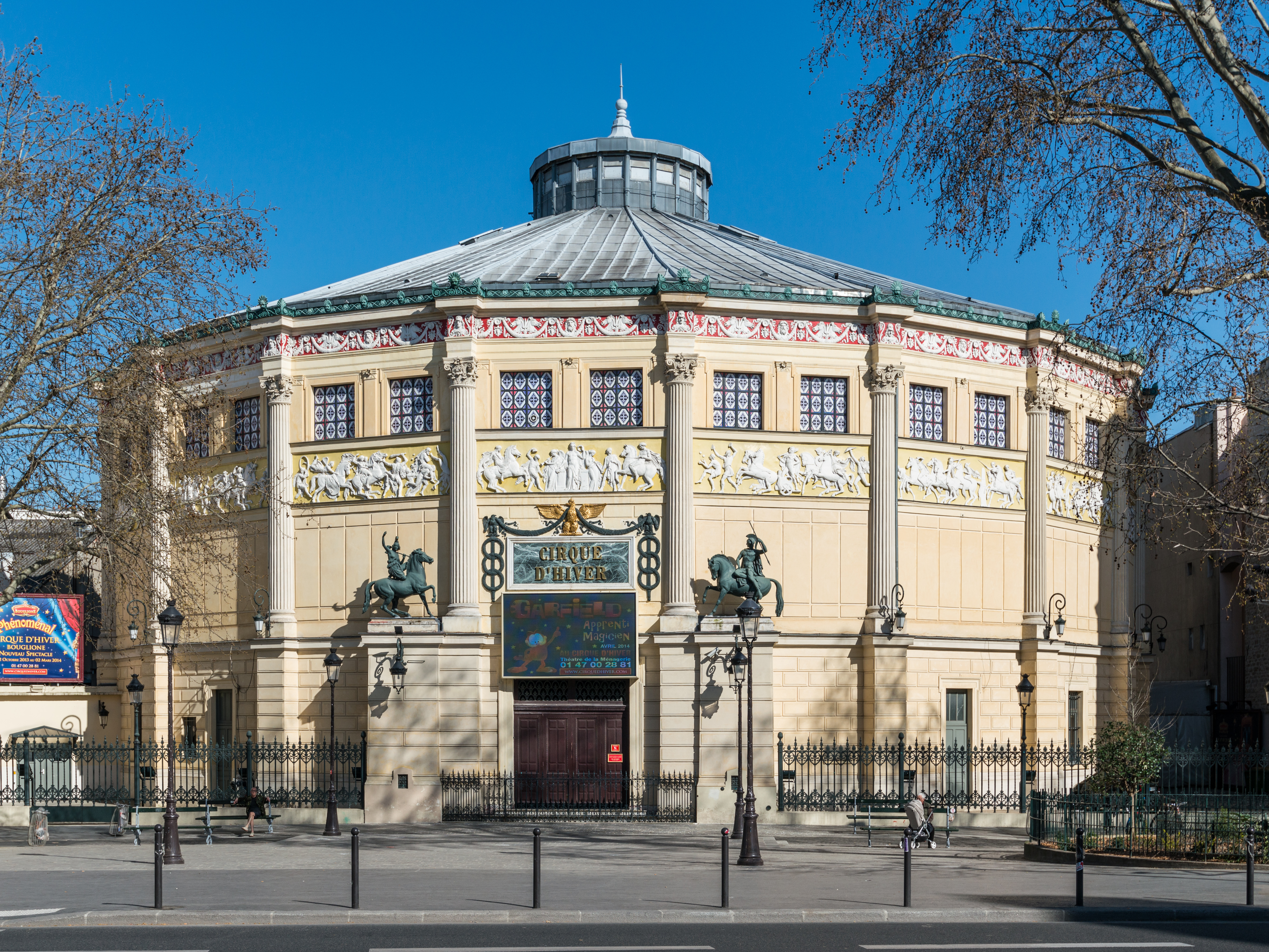
- The Cirque d'Hiver in Paris

- Coat of arms

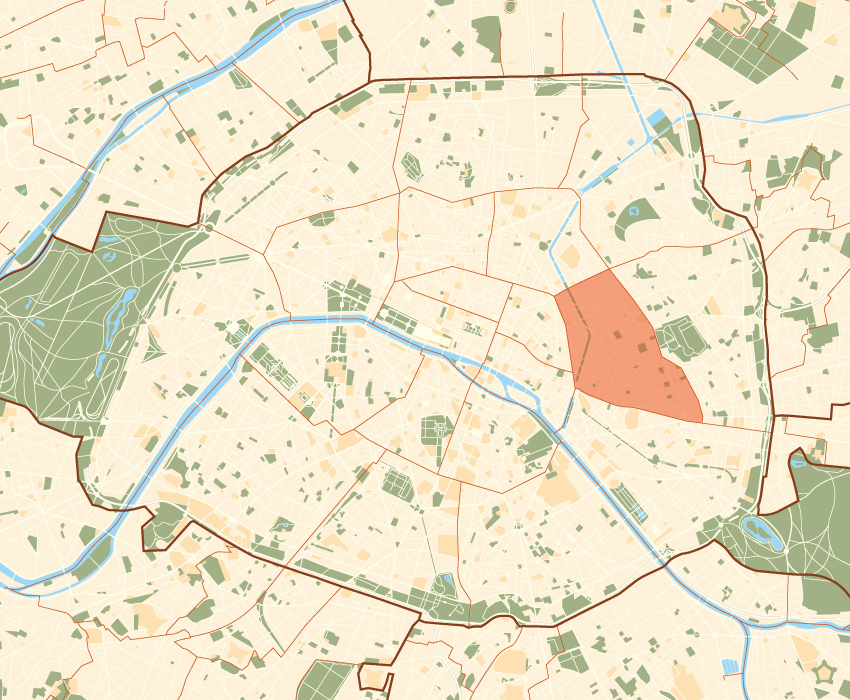
- Location within Paris
- Coordinates: 48°51′31″N 2°22′46″E
- Country: France
- Region: Île-de-France
- Department: Paris
- Commune: Paris

Government
  - Mayor (2026–2032): David Belliard (LE)
- Area: 3.67 km^{2} (1.42 sq mi)
- Population (2023): 138,170
  - Density: 37,600/km^{2} (97,500/sq mi)
- INSEE code: 75111

The 11th arrondissement of Paris (XI^{e} arrondissement) is one of the 20 arrondissements of the capital city of France. In spoken French, the arrondissement is referred to as le onzième ([ɔ̃zjɛm]; "the eleventh").

The arrondissement, called Popincourt, is situated on the right bank of the River Seine. It is one of the most densely populated urban districts of any European city. In 2023, it had a population of 138,170. It is the best-served Parisian arrondissement in terms of number of Métro stations, at 25.

Its borders are marked by three large squares: the Place de la République to the northwest, the Place de la Bastille to the southwest, as well as the Place de la Nation to the southeast.

== Description ==
The 11th arrondissement is a varied area. To the west lies the Place de la République, which is linked to the Place de la Bastille, in the east, by the tree-lined Boulevard Richard-Lenoir, with its large markets and children's parks. The Place de la Bastille and the Rue du Faubourg Saint-Antoine are full of cafés, restaurants, and nightlife; they also contain a range of boutiques and galleries. The Oberkampf district to the north is another popular area for nightlife. The east is more residential, with more wholesale commerce, while the areas around Boulevard Voltaire and Avenue Parmentier are crossroads for the local community. In recent years this area has emerged as one of the trendiest parts of Paris.

On 13 November 2015, the arrondissement was the site (among others) of coordinated Islamic shootings and bombings, particularly at the Bataclan theatre, which left 130 dead. About 20 years earlier, another attack had taken place.

== Geography ==
The quarters of the 11th arrondissement

The land area of this arrondissement is 3.666 km^{2} (1.415 sq mi; 906 acres).

The arrondissement consists of four quarters:

- Quartier Folie-Méricourt (41)
- Quartier Saint-Ambroise (42)
- Quartier Roquette (43)
- Quartier Sainte-Marguerite (44)

== Demographics ==
The peak population of Paris's 11th arrondissement occurred in 1911, with 242,295 inhabitants, and so, 66,020 inhabitants/km^{2}. In 2023, the arrondissement remains the most densely populated in Paris with 37,690 inhabitants/km^{2}, and the densest urban district in Europe. It is accompanied by a large volume of business activity: 83,870 jobs.

The population consists of a large number of single adults, though its eastern portions are more family-oriented. There is a strong community spirit in most areas of the eleventh, and it is interspersed with squares and parks.

=== Historical population ===
Historical population

| Year | Pop. | ±% p.a. |
|---|---|---|
| 1861 | 125,718 | — |
| 1872 | 167,393 | +2.64% |
| 1881 | 213,128 | +2.72% |
| 1891 | 217,016 | +0.18% |
| 1901 | 239,149 | +0.98% |
| 1911 | 242,295 | +0.13% |
| 1921 | 229,855 | −0.53% |
| 1931 | 219,471 | −0.46% |
| 1936 | 204,542 | −1.40% |
| 1946 | 188,547 | −0.81% |
| 1954 | 200,440 | +0.77% |

| Year | Pop. | ±% p.a. |
|---|---|---|
| 1962 | 193,349 | −0.45% |
| 1968 | 179,727 | −1.21% |
| 1975 | 159,317 | −1.71% |
| 1982 | 146,931 | −1.15% |
| 1990 | 154,165 | +0.60% |
| 1999 | 149,102 | −0.37% |
| 2007 | 151,421 | +0.19% |
| 2012 | 155,006 | +0.47% |
| 2017 | 146,643 | −1.10% |
| 2023 | 138,170 | −0.99% |

Source: Demographia (1861-1999) and INSEE (1876-2023)

=== Immigration ===
Place of birth of residents of the 11th arrondissement in 1999
| Born in metropolitan France | Born outside metropolitan France | | | |
|---|---|---|---|---|
| 74.5% | 25.5% | | | |
| 74.5% | Born in overseas France | Born in foreign countries with French citizenship at birth^{1} | EU-15 immigrants^{2} | Non-EU-15 immigrants |
| 74.5% | 1.3% | 4.1% | 4.4% | 15.7% |
^{1} This group is made up largely of former French settlers, such as pieds-noirs in Northwest Africa, followed by former colonial citizens who had French citizenship at birth (such as was often the case for the native elite in French colonies), as well as to a lesser extent foreign-born children of French expatriates. A foreign country is understood as a country not part of France in 1999, so a person born for example in 1950 in Algeria, when Algeria was an integral part of France, is nonetheless listed as a person born in a foreign country in French statistics.^{2} An immigrant is a person born in a foreign country not having French citizenship at birth. An immigrant may have acquired French citizenship since moving to France, but is still considered an immigrant in French statistics. On the other hand, persons born in France with foreign citizenship (the children of immigrants) are not listed as immigrants.

== Map ==
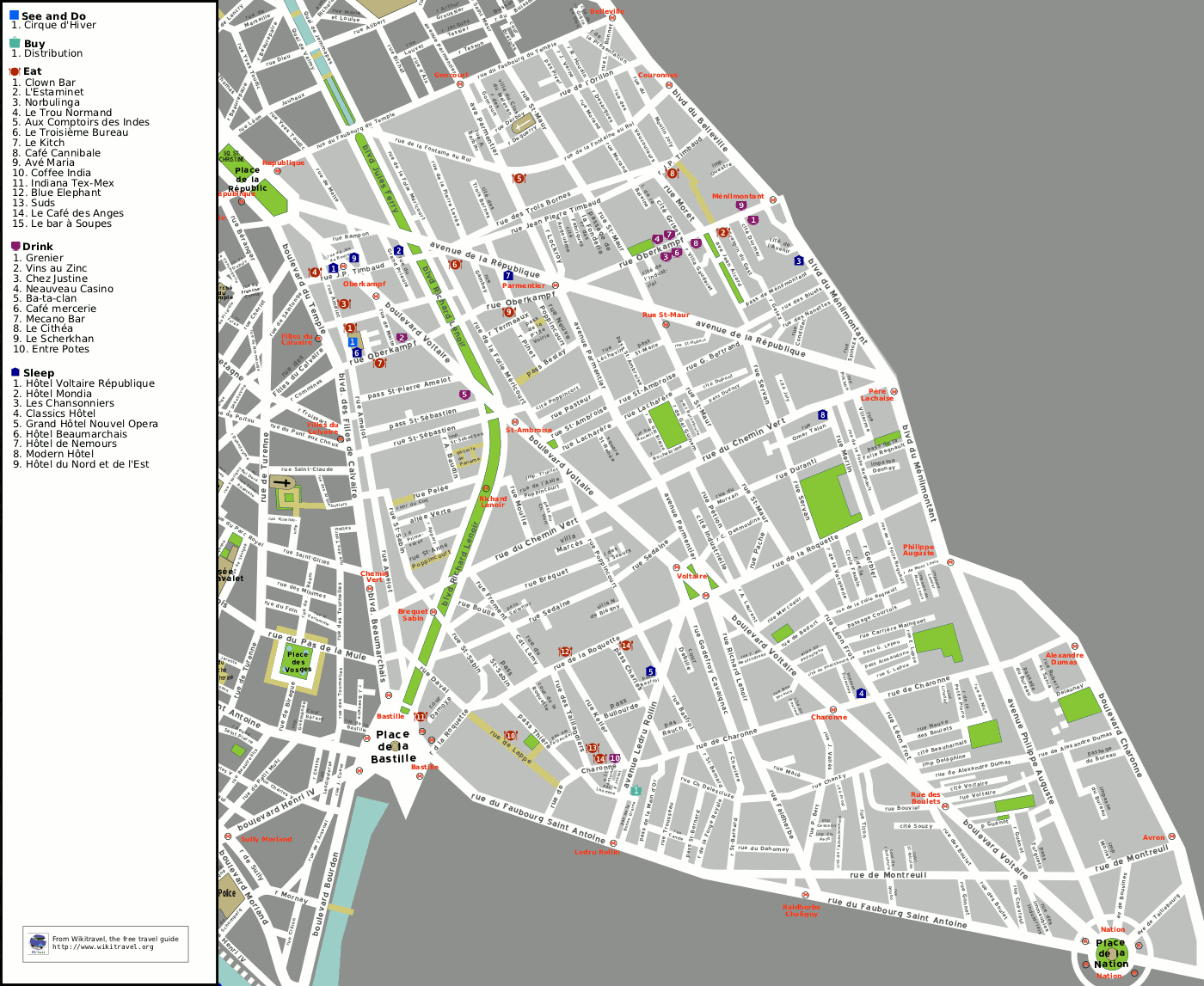
Map of the 11th arrondissement

== Places of interest ==
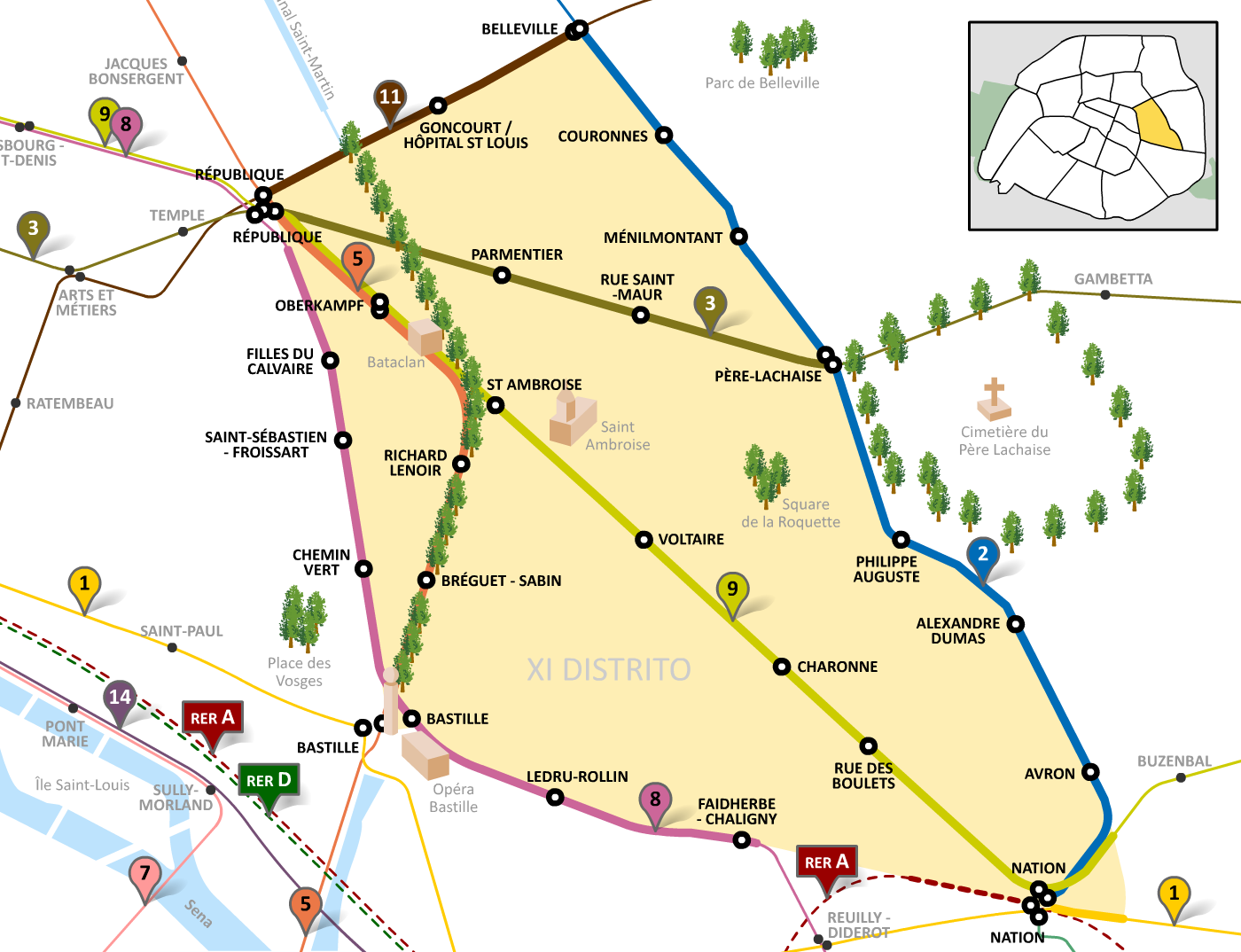

- Cirque d'hiver
- Saint-Joseph-des-Nations
- Sainte-Marguerite, Paris
- Église Saint-Ambroise
- ESCP-EAP
- Musée Édith Piaf
- Musée du Fumeur
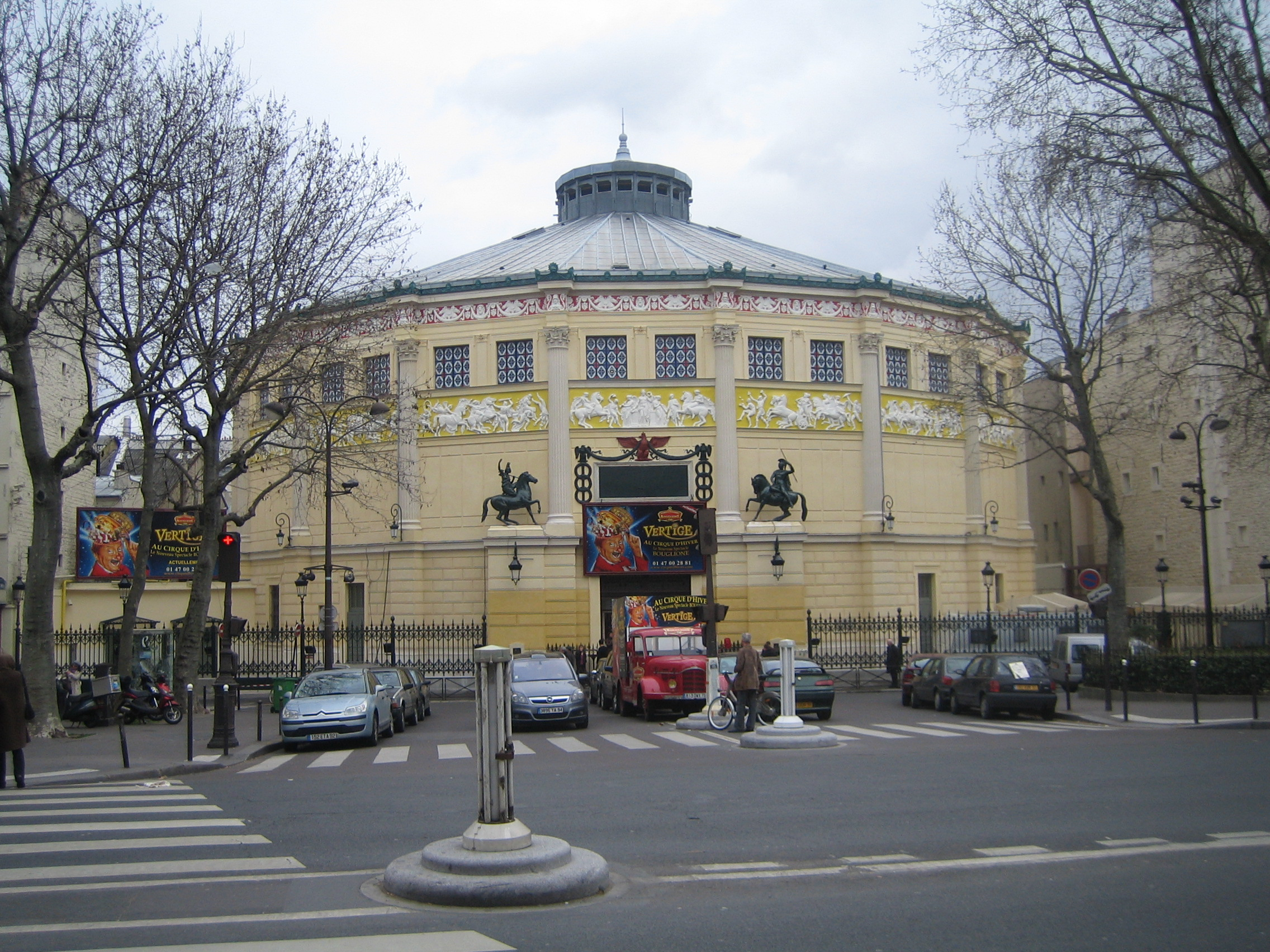
Cirque d'hiver

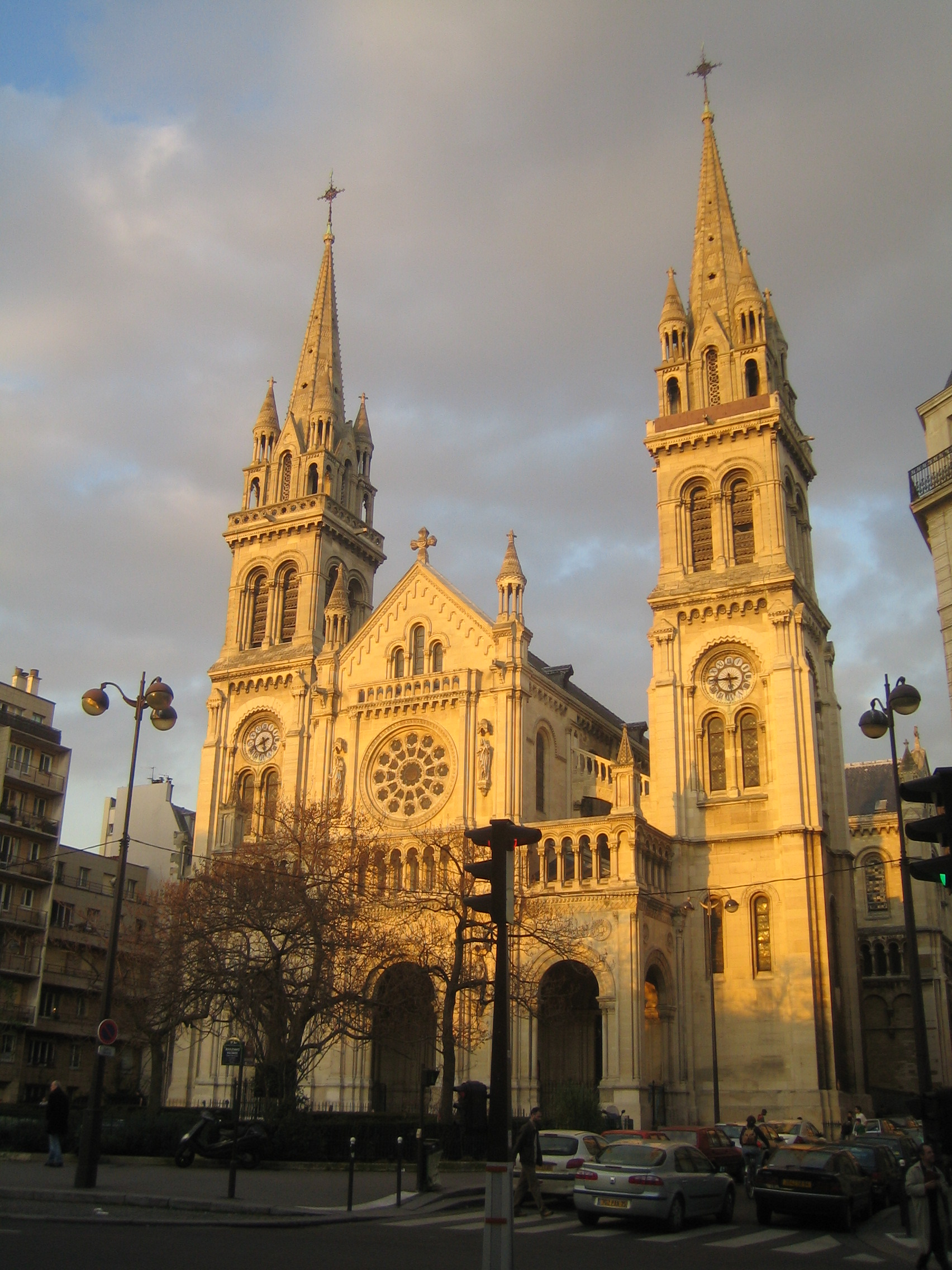
Église Saint-Ambroise

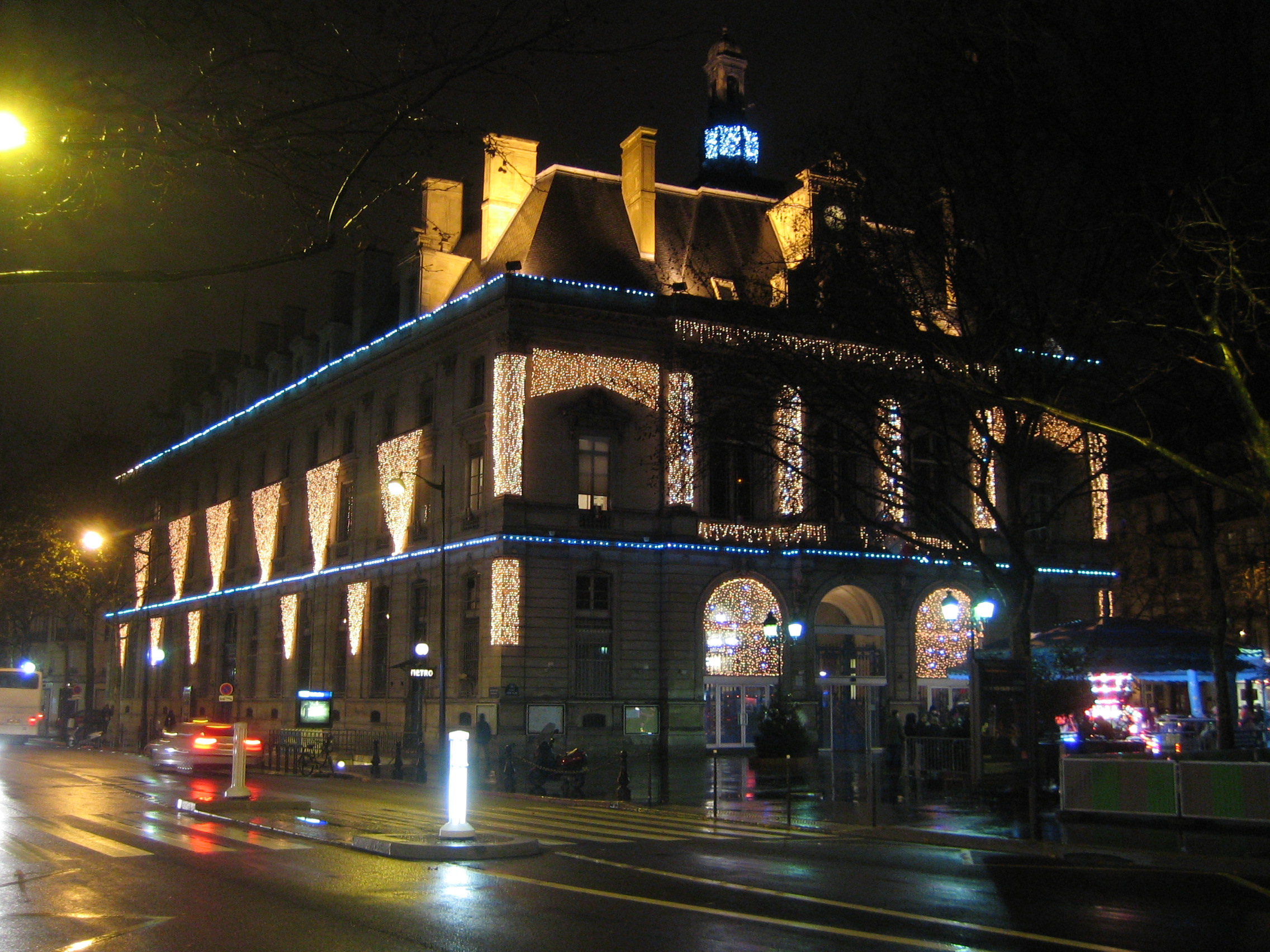
Arrondissement hall

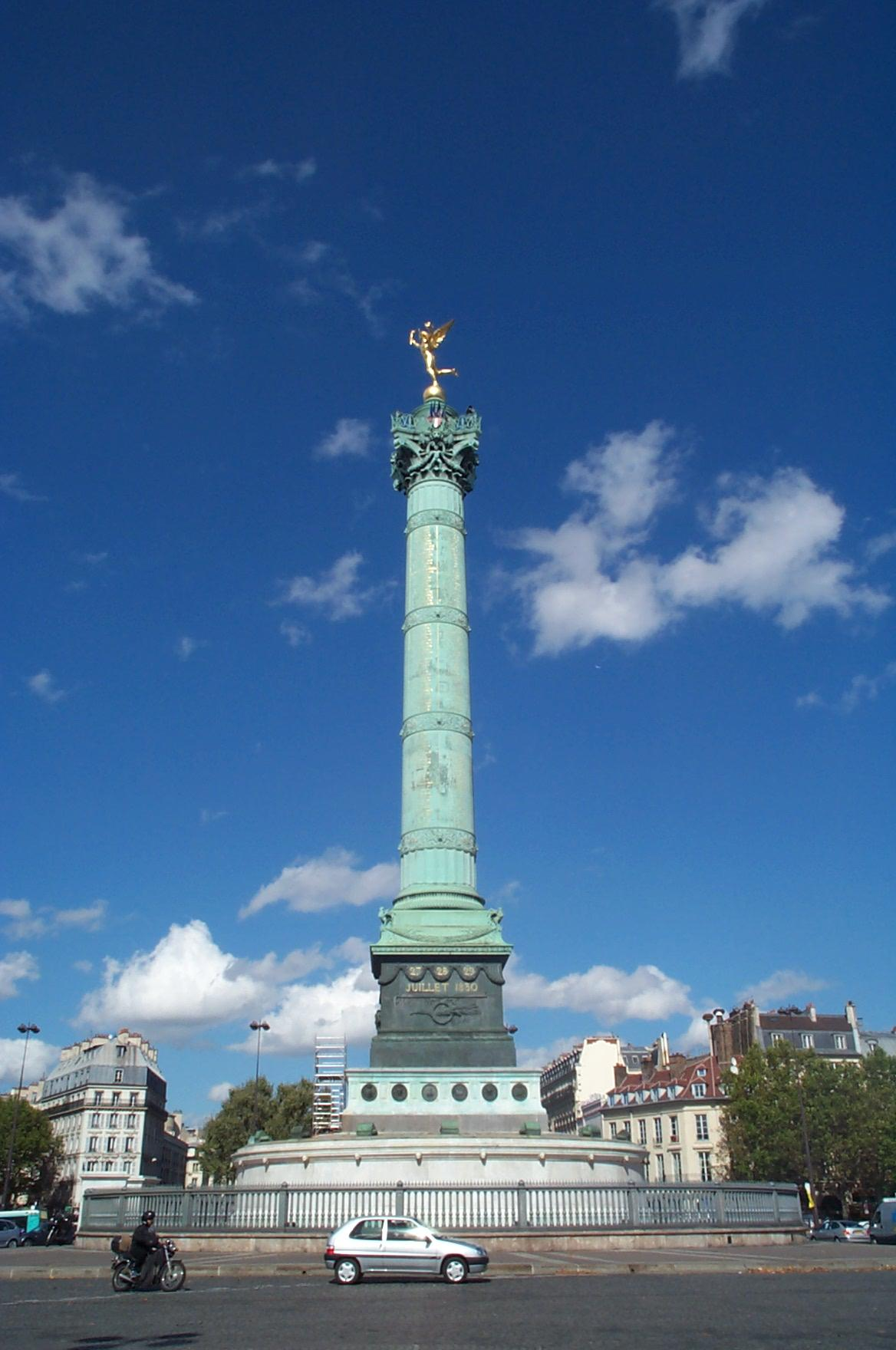
Bastille

== Main streets and squares ==
=== Streets ===
- Rue Abel-Rabaud
- Rue Alexandre-Dumas
- Rue Amelot
- Rue Auguste-Laurent
- Rue Basfroi
- Boulevard Beaumarchais
- Boulevard de Belleville
- Cité Bertrand
- Passage Beslay
- Rue des Bluets
- Passage de la Bonne-Graine
- Rue des Boulets
- Avenue de Bouvines
- Rue de Candie
- Rue Chanzy
- Passage Charles-Dallery
- Rue Charles-Delescluze
- Boulevard de Charonne
- Rue de Charonne
- Rue du Chemin-Vert
- Rue du Chevet
- Rue Chevreul
- Rue de Crussol
- Rue Darboy
- Rue Daval
- Rue Deguerry
- Passage Dudouy
- Rue Faidherbe
- Rue du Faubourg-du-Temple
- Rue du Faubourg-Saint-Antoine
- Boulevard des Filles-du-Calvaire
- Rue de la Folie-Méricourt
- Rue de la Folie-Regnault
- Rue de la Fontaine-au-Roi
- Rue Froment
- Rue Godefroy-Cavaignac
- Rue Guillaume-Bertrand
- Rue des Immeubles-Industriels
- Rue Jacquard
- Rue Jean-Pierre-Timbaud
- Passage Josset
- Boulevard Jules-Ferry
- Rue Keller
- Rue de Lappe
- Rue La Vacquerie
- Avenue Ledru-Rollin
- Rue Léon-Frot
- Passage Lhomme
- Rue Louis-Bonnet
- Boulevard de Ménilmontant
- Rue Merlin
- Rue de Mont-Louis
- Rue de Montreuil
- Rue Morand
- Rue Moret
- Rue de Nemours
- Rue Neuve-Popincourt
- Rue Oberkampf
- Rue Omer-Talon
- Rue de l'Orillon
- Avenue Parmentier
- Rue du Pasteur-Wagner
- Rue Paul-Bert
- Avenue Philippe-Auguste
- Rue de la Pierre-Levée
- Rue Popincourt
- Rue Rampon
- Avenue de la République
- Boulevard Richard-Lenoir
- Rue de la Roquette
- Rue Saint-Ambroise
- Passage Saint-Antoine
- Rue Saint-Bernard
- Rue Saint-Maur
- Rue Saint-Sabin
- Rue Saint-Sébastien
- Rue Sedaine
- Rue Servan
- Boulevard du Temple
- Rue Ternaux
- Rue des Trois-Bornes
- Rue des Trois-Couronnes
- Avenue du Trône
- Rue Trousseau
- Boulevard Voltaire
- Rue de Belfort

=== Squares ===
- Place du 8 Février 1962
- Place des Antilles
- Place de la Bastille
- Place Léon-Blum
- Place de la Nation
- Place Pasdeloup
- Place de la République
- Square Bréguet-Sabin
- Square Colbert
- Square de la Folie-Régnault
- Square de la place Pasdeloup
- Square de la Roquette
- Square Denis-Poulot
- Square du Bataclan
- Square du docteur Antoine-Béclère
- Square Francis-Lemarque
- Square Godefroy-Cavaignac
- Square Jean-Aicard
- Square Jules-Ferry
- Square Louis-Majorelle
- Square Maurice-Gardette
- Square Mercœur
- Square Raoul-Nordling
- Square Saint-Ambroise
