= CityStrides =

Web application for tracking progress in walking every street in an area

- Website type: Web application
- Available in: English
- Owner: James Chevalier
- Website: citystrides.com
- Registration: Required
- Launched: 2013
- Current status: Active

CityStrides is a web-based application that allows users to track and visualize their progress in walking or running every street within a defined geographic area, like a municipality. These walkers or runners may approach these activities in an "every street" activity, in which they aim to traverse all streets in a city or neighborhood.

== History ==
CityStrides was created by software developer James Chevalier, who developed the tool while attempting to run every street in Holyoke, Massachusetts. The site launched in 2013. The application uses geographic data, including OpenStreetMap, to map streets and calculate user progress.

== Features ==
CityStrides enables users to upload GPS activity data from walking or running. It then overlays these completed routes onto maps of streets from OpenStreetMap. The application tracks which streets have been completed (per municipality) and provides visualizations and statistics that show completed streets and segments, and it summarizes progress within a selected area. It is also possible to compare progress to other users, competing to see who has completed more streets or cities.

== Use and cultural context ==
CityStrides has been used by participants in the "every street" movement, a practice in which individuals attempt to walk or run every street in a city. While the idea predates the application, the availability of digital tracking tools led to the development of the application and facilitated usage, and reports in the news attracted more users.

The application saw increased use during the COVID-19 pandemic, when lockdowns and restrictions on travel led some people to explore their communities more extensively. Media reports described individuals using tools such as CityStrides to track their progress as they walked or ran every street in their communities. According to Chevalier, tens of thousands of users joined the platform during this period.

Participants have used the application to document large-scale walking or running projects, including attempts to cover all streets in cities and towns. Reports in the news found that these running or walking activities can involve hundreds or thousands of miles and may take months or years to complete, depending on the size of the city. Media coverage has also documented individuals undertaking long-term efforts to walk or run every street in major cities. In Chicago, for example, a graduate student was reported in 2025 to have completed roughly half of the city’s streets as part of such a project. Similar efforts have been reported internationally, including a runner in Birmingham, England, who completed all of the city’s approximately 8,000 streets.

== Reception ==
Coverage of CityStrides has generally appeared in the context of broader reporting on urban exploration and pandemic-era exercise trends. Journalists have described the application as a tool that helps structure and visualize the goal of covering every street in a given area. Accounts of users of CityStrides describe their use in physical fitness, exploration of local environments, and during the pandemic, coping with disruptions to daily routines.

== See also ==
- Urban exploration
- Walking
- Running
