= Louis-Étienne Héricart de Thury =

French politician

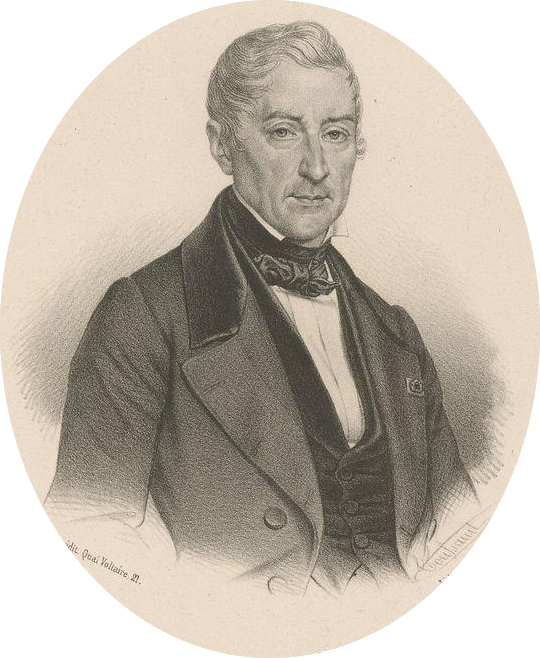
Louis-Étienne Héricart de Thury.

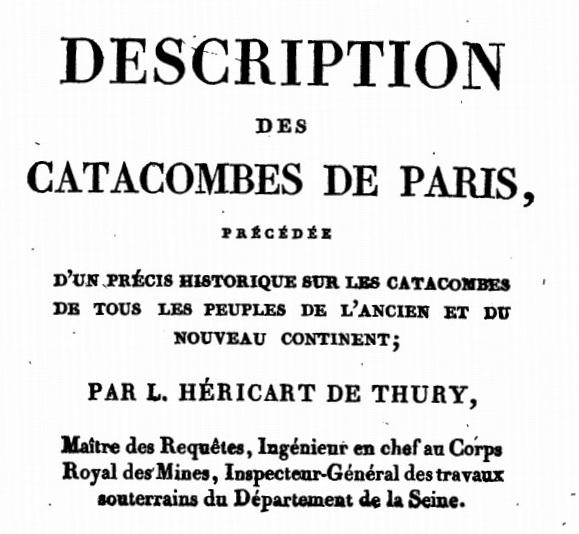
Title page of the book lion of (Paris catacombs) published in 1815 by Héricart de Thury.

Louis-Étienne François Héricart-Ferrand, vicomte de Thury (Paris, 3 June 1776 – Rome, 15 January 1854) was a French politician and man of science. He was a mining engineer who produced more than 350 scholarly articles; was a member of numerous societies and professional associations. He was heir to an estate of great horticultural richness with the equivalent of a private arboretum. He was a founding member of the National Horticultural Society of France.

His family were of the noblesse de robe, his father a master councillor at the Cour des Comptes.

The Héricart showed an aptitude for science and was enrolled in the École des Mines 13 April 1795. His first commissions sent him on several trips to the south of France. In 1809 he was assigned the position of general inspector of quarries, a position he held, under changes of government, until 1830. Following the work of Charles Axel Guillaumot, he undertook the work researching and consolidating former Paris' subterranean mines including the famed Catacombs of Paris.

In 1814 he was received a member of the Société royale et centrale d'agriculture, first of a long list of scientific societies in which he was a member or correspondent. He was named director of the Bâtiments civils of Paris in 1823, and in that capacity oversaw the construction of the Paris Bourse, the completion of the Arc de Triomphe and the transformation of the Hôtel de Cluny into a museum.

He was elected a member of the Académie des sciences in 1824. He was listed among the four hundred founding members of the Société d'horticulture de Paris, 11 June 1827.

He was returned as député on three elections, in 1815, 1820 and 1824, then was defeated in the election of 1827. He was a member of the court circle of Charles X and an adherent of the arch-conservative minister Villèle. He was a prime mover of the purchase of the Palais Bourbon, seat of the Assemblée Nationale, by the French government in 1827.

In the last years of his life he was often asked to serve on juries judging expositions. He resigned the presidency of the Société d'horticulture in 1851. That same year he accompanied his son to Italy, where he died in Rome, 1854.
