= As Above, So Below (film) =

2014 film by John Erick Dowdle

- Theatrical release poster
- Directed by: John Erick Dowdle
- Written by: Drew Dowdle; John Erick Dowdle
- Produced by: Thomas Tull; Jon Jashni; Drew Dowdle; Patrick Aiello
- Starring: Perdita Weeks; Ben Feldman; Edwin Hodge
- Cinematography: Léo Hinstin
- Edited by: Elliot Greenberg
- Music by: Keefus Ciancia
- Production companies: Legendary Pictures; Brothers Dowdle
- Distributed by: Universal Pictures
- Release date: August 29, 2014
- Running time: 93 minutes
- Country: United States
- Language: English
- Budget: $5–10 million
- Box office: $41.8 million

As Above, So Below (Note: Officially billed as As Above/So Below) is a 2014 American horror film directed by John Erick Dowdle, who co-wrote it with his brother Drew Dowdle. It stars Perdita Weeks, Ben Feldman, Edwin Hodge, François Civil, Marion Lambert and Ali Marhyar. Presented as found footage, the film follows a group of explorers venturing into the Catacombs of Paris in search of the philosopher's stone, only to be confronted by supernatural forces.

The film is loosely based on the nine circles of Hell from Inferno, the first part of Dante Alighieri's Divine Comedy, and takes its title from the Hermetic maxim "as above, so below", a paraphrase associated with the Emerald Tablet. It was the first film to be granted permission to shoot in the actual Catacombs of Paris. It was produced by Legendary Pictures and the Dowdle brothers' own company Brothers Dowdle, while being distributed by Universal Pictures, making it the first film released under Legendary's deal with Universal.

The film was released theatrically on August 29, 2014. It received mostly negative reviews from critics but was a box office success, grossing $41.8 million worldwide on a $5–10 million budget. In September 2018, the film became available to stream on Netflix and became popular on the platform, subsequently building a large cult following.

== Plot ==
Polymath and archaeologist Scarlett Marlowe continues her late father's search for the legendary philosopher's stone, an alchemical substance discovered by Nicolas Flamel allegedly capable of turning base metals into gold or silver and granting eternal life. After obtaining the "Rose Key" artifact in an Iranian cave, she has a vision of a hanged man before escaping.

Scarlett travels to Paris, where her search becomes the subject of a documentary filmed by Benji. Assisted by her friend, Aramaic translator George, she uses the key to solve a riddle that points them towards the Catacombs of Paris. When they are unable to access a specific tunnel, a stranger directs them to a nearby nightclub to find cataphile Papillon. Visiting the club, the trio recruit him, his girlfriend Souxie and their friend Zed to assist in their excursion.

Papillon leads the group to an off-limits entrance. Scarlett insists on taking a shortcut through a side tunnel, causing Papillon to refuse, warning her that people disappear inside, including his own friend, La Taupe. After taking an alternative route that collapses behind them, they find themselves facing the same tunnel and are forced to go through it. Inside, they find La Taupe, who tells them that going further down is the only way out. They eventually find a tomb holding the "philosopher's stone"; Scarlett seizes it, fulfilling her search. Papillon's group inadvertently triggers a booby trap that causes the ceiling to collapse and seemingly separates Taupe.

Scarlett uses the stone to heal Souxie's wound. They find a drawing of a door on the ceiling along with a Gnostic Star of David, symbolizing "as above, so below", which reveals a hidden opening in the floor. Going through, they find a tunnel marked with the phrase "Abandon all hope, ye who enter here". (Note: An inscription on the gates of Hell in Dante's Inferno)

They enter an inverted mockery of the catacombs, where Taupe murders Souxie before disappearing. As they descend deeper, Benji and Papillon are murdered by spirits representing their past sins. The remaining three continue to flee, when a demon bites George's throat. Unable to heal George using the stone, now revealed to be false, Scarlett returns it and discovers that its power resides within her. While returning to George and Zed, she sees the hanged man and recognizes him as her father's vengeful spirit; she apologizes for neglecting to have a final conversation via telephone with him and he vanishes. She returns to George and heals him with a kiss.

The trio is chased to a dark hole, where Scarlett tells them that they must confess their sins before jumping in. George confesses that he failed to save his brother Danny from drowning and Zed does so about a child he refuses to claim. They enter and find a manhole at the bottom; opening it, they invertedly emerge near Notre-Dame. Scarlett and George embrace while Zed walks away, finally safe.

In an ending log, Scarlett states her search was to never seek or obtain any material treasure, but only the truth.

== Cast ==
- Perdita Weeks as Scarlett Marlowe, an accomplished scholar in search of the philosopher's stone. She is clever but reckless in her pursuit for the philosopher's stone.
- Ben Feldman as George, Scarlett's ex-boyfriend and an Aramaic translator with a hobby for breaking into old buildings to repair things.
- Edwin Hodge as Benji, Scarlett's camera operator and tech specialist.
- François Civil as Papillon, a cataphile and the group's guide through the Catacombs of Paris.
- Marion Lambert as Souxie, Papillon's girlfriend.
- Ali Marhyar as Zed, Papillon's friend.
- Pablo Nicomedes as La Taupe, Papillon's friend who lived in the catacombs for five years until his disappearance down a disused tunnel.
- Hamidreza Javdan as Reza
- Roger Van Hool as Scarlett's unnamed late father, once a scholar in pursuit of the philosopher's stone.
- Samuel Aouizerate as Danny, George's younger brother who drowned when he was still a child.
- Olivia Csiky Trnka and Théo Cholbi as cult members
- Kaya Blocksage as a curator

== Production ==
=== Development ===
As Above, So Below was directed by John Erick Dowdle from a screenplay he co-wrote with his brother, Drew Dowdle. The Dowdle brothers said they always wanted to make a documentary-style or found footage Indiana Jones-type film with a female lead. Thomas Tull, the head of Legendary Pictures, called them and said he would love to do something in the Parisian catacombs, and the brothers said that it would be perfect if the characters were searching for something down there, which turned out to be Nicolas Flamel's philosopher's stone that leads the film's main character, Scarlett Marlowe, into the catacombs. The Dowdle brothers started developing ideas for the project in 2008. John Erick Dowdle went to Paris in 2007 and tried to see the catacombs, but they were closed due to vandalism. The character Scarlett came to life in 2010. While scouting locations for the film, the Dowdle brothers spent four weeks in the catacombs and a week above ground.

The project was officially announced by Variety on April 22, 2013. The film went from the pitch to a director's cut in seven months. The film's estimated production budget was $5–10 million. It was produced by Legendary Pictures and Brothers Dowdle and distributed by Universal Pictures, making it the first film in Legendary's deal with Universal.

=== Casting ===
Auditions were held in London, Los Angeles and Paris. For the role of Scarlett, the filmmakers said they wanted someone who "not only you would love to take a road trip with or watch a baseball game with, but also someone that you believe that could be smart to the point of genius and also funny, and not just put glasses on a pretty girl". They auditioned around 300 actresses and found English actress Perdita Weeks in London. Both Dowdle brothers liked Weeks in different audition tapes that she submitted as she had different hair colors in each of them (blonde in one and brunette in the other), which caused a bit of confusion at first because they thought they had liked different actresses until they realized it was the same person. For the role of George, they wanted someone who could be likeable and funny and that you can believe that is smart, so they found American actor Ben Feldman in Los Angeles, "who is all those things," according to John Erick Dowdle.

=== Influences ===
The plot was loosely based on the nine circles of Hell from Dante Alighieri's epic 14th-century poem Divine Comedy. The Dowdle brothers also used elements from their previous films, The Poughkeepsie Tapes (2007), Quarantine (2008) and Devil (2010). Drew Dowdle said they did not want another underground creature movie, and that Neil Marshall "did that quite well" with The Descent (2005), they wanted to do something outside of that, but still include an element of the supernatural.

During pre-production, the Dowdle brothers talked to a lot of "cataphiles" (as they call themselves) and asked them about the strangest things they came across in the Paris catacombs. They found out that choirs and musicians sing and play in the catacombs unannounced due to the sound quality of the place, so they decided to have an all-female choir in the film. This scene was inspired by a scene in Andrei Tarkovsky's film Andrei Rublev (1966), where a monk is walking through the woods and finds a witch coven with people running naked.

Other influences include The Da Vinci Code (2006), The Goonies (1985), Flatliners (1990), Event Horizon (1997) and The Dirty Dozen (1967)–the Dowdle brothers said they wanted to make "The Dirty Dozen goes to hell". The opening sequence is reminiscent of The Exorcist (1973).

=== Filming ===
The film was shot in Paris for two months in 2013. With permission from the French authorities, the film was shot in the real catacombs of Paris, making it the first film to get permission to shoot both in the public and in the off-limits area of the catacombs. Permission was granted the night before shooting was scheduled to begin in the catacombs. Shot over a period of six weeks, shooting took place underground in the catacombs for five weeks. The underwater scenes were shot on a sound stage.

There was very little use of props, as the actors had to use the environment around them. Production in the actual catacombs was difficult for the cast and crew, as there was no electricity or cell phone service in the centuries-old tunnels. Walkie-talkies and wireless monitors did not work there either. The filmmakers decided they would not bring lights to the catacombs and would just film it documentary-style, with a realistic approach to the camera and lighting. Many scenes were lit up by the actors themselves with their head lamps. John Erick Dowdle said that the actors were shooting the film 90% of the time. Some days they had water up to their waists, and sometimes they had to crawl around on all fours for an hour. They had to keep an arm up because the ceiling lowered at any point, so that they would hit their arms on the ceiling instead of their faces. Drew Dowdle said that all of them took some head divots while filming, and he took one that did not heal for six months.

The air and water quality in the catacombs were tested before shooting to make sure that people would not walk through battery acid. One of the catacombs' locations was six flights of stairs down, while another one was through a little hole in the ground. The only entrance to one of the main locations in the catacombs was through the parking lot of an hospital. Ben Feldman said: "We would go into the trailers and get covered in blood, dust, scars, and gore, and then grab our coffees, and have a leisurely stroll through a hospital parking lot past doctors and patients all staring at us. We were just covered in blood and walking past all these people who could theoretically save us". Feldman also said that it was claustrophobic, cold, wet, tight, uncomfortable and there were no bathrooms in the catacombs, but that nobody had any major claustrophobia issues down there. Drew Dowdle said it was very hard spending four hours down in the catacombs and then coming out into Parisian June, and that they could not handle any sunlight and became "mole people".

John Erick Dowdle said that both the actors and the crew were asked if they were claustrophobic, and then they did a wardrobe test underground to make sure they were not. The director said that one of the actors was not very comfortable down there, so they decided to make his character claustrophobic in the film. While on set, the actor had to take a moment and calm himself down. John Erick Dowdle said that they could feel his anxiety. "That particular actor had the most claustrophobic scene in the movie and he seemed to really enjoy what it did for his performance. His performance was so solid and I don't think it was much acting," Drew Dowdle said. The actor's name was not revealed. At least one of the actors, Feldman, has said that he is not claustrophobic.

Some scenes were a total surprise for the actors, such as the scene with the all-female choir singing topless in the catacombs. The actors were kept in another part of the caves while the crew was setting up the shot, then they were told, "You know your lines, you know what's happening in the scene, go in that direction and it'll happen", according to Feldman.

The piano from George's childhood that he sees in the catacombs, was designed to look like a piano that the Dowdle brothers owned and used to jump off as kids. In the film, George mentions that he and his brother used to jump off that piano when they were kids. The crew wanted to do a hollow piano, but the Dowdle brothers wanted a real piano, so it had to be taken to the catacombs by a piano mover and later removed after the shoot. That particular quarry where the piano was placed was six stories down and only accessible by a manhole cover with chimney under it and a long staircase. John Erick Dowdle said the piano mover had "the most thankless job" by bringing the piano down there and moving it back out.

A real car was taken to the catacombs to be set on fire with an actor in it. Pyrotechnics were used and director John Erick Dowdle tested it on himself first, not only to ensure safety, but also because he was amazed by the effects.

The Dowdle brothers wanted to shoot in a quarry of the catacombs that was used by the Nazis to hide bombs during World War II and had one sign that said "Adolf Hitler Strasse" ("Adolf Hitler Street"), but it was damaged after being bombed by the allies and the film's safety people advised them not to shoot in there because the ceilings could fall.

Other filming locations in Paris were the Fontaine des Innocents, the Père Lachaise Cemetery, the Musée de Cluny, the Pont Alexandre III and the Eiffel Tower.

=== Post-production ===
Elliot Greenberg started editing the film while shooting was still happening. As Above, So Below was edited at the same time as Dowdle's next film, No Escape (2015). Greenberg traveled to Thailand to work on No Escape while his assistant finished As Above, So Below.

== Marketing ==
The first trailer of the film was revealed on April 24, 2014. YouTuber PewDiePie and his wife Marzia Bisognin promoted the film by embarking on a quest into the catacombs, where they would be scared in a variety of ways.

== Release ==
The film was originally scheduled to be released on August 15, 2014. The release date was pushed back and the film was released theatrically in the United States by Universal Pictures on August 29, 2014.

== Reception ==
=== Critical response ===
On Rotten Tomatoes, the film holds an approval rating of 31% based on 80 reviews, and an average rating of 5.00/10. The website's critical consensus reads, "After an intriguing setup that threatens to claw its way out of found-footage overkill, As Above, So Below plummets into clichéd mediocrity." On Metacritic, the film has a weighted average score of 39 out of 100 based on 24 critics, indicating "generally unfavorable" reviews. Audiences polled by CinemaScore gave the film an average grade of "C−" on an A+ to F scale.

Peter Debruge gave the film a mixed review in Variety, writing, "It all makes for clumsy-fun escapism, not bad as end-of-summer chillers go, but small-time compared with other Legendary releases." Debruge also called the ending "unspeakably corny". Kyle Anderson's review in Entertainment Weekly stated, "As Above has some genuine scares. The stakes begin as gut-wrenchingly real with the team feeling disoriented hundreds of meters beneath the streets, but the film gets downright silly once the caverns become malevolently sentient." Bruce Demara wrote in The Toronto Star, "As Above, So Below has some good scares and a decent cast. But it's yet another found footage thriller, so jittery camera sequences may induce nausea." Peter Bradshaw stated in The Guardian, "There are some interestingly contrived moments of claustrophobia and surreal lunacy, but this clichéd and slightly hand-me-down script neither scares nor amuses very satisfyingly." Drew Hunt expressed similar sentiments in The Chicago Reader, writing "An intriguing and intensely creepy premise is squandered on this rudimentary found-footage horror film." Terry Staunton gave the film a mildly positive review in Radio Times, stating, "It's a perfectly serviceable addition to the 'found footage' genre of chillers from director/co-writer John Erick Dowdle (Devil), who puts cameras in each character's helmet, allowing quick cuts from one scene to another. But despite the claustrophobia of the setting, he never quite racks up enough tension for a full-on fright-fest." The entertainment oriented website JoBlo wrote, "Not the worst example of found footage by a long shot, and it moves a decent pace with a couple of good scares. However, this could have been a far more frightening feature if only it had expanded on its scary premise."

=== Box office ===
The film grossed $8.3 million its opening weekend, finishing in third place. It went on to gross $21.3 million in North America and $20.6 million in other territories, for a total worldwide gross of $41.8 million.

== Home media ==
As Above, So Below was released on DVD and Blu-ray on December 2, 2014. The film was made available on Netflix in the United States in 2018 and became very popular in the streaming service, gaining a cult following. It was removed from Netflix in 2021, returned in 2024, and removed again in 2025.

A collector's edition Blu-ray was released by Shout! Factory on October 1, 2024. It features a new artwork and the bonus include new interviews with director John Erick Dowdle and producer/co-writer Drew Dowdle.

A limited edition Blu-ray was released in Australia by Via Vision Entertainment on March 26, 2025. It features new extras, such as interviews with actor Ben Feldman and director of photography Léo Hinstin, audio commentary by film critic Alexandra Heller-Nicholas, and a video essay by Dread Central editor-in-chief Mary Beth McAndrews.

In January 2026, the film experienced renewed popularity after trending in the top 10 titles on HBO Max's movies section worldwide.
