= Urban exploration =

Exploration of hidden or abandoned buildings and structures

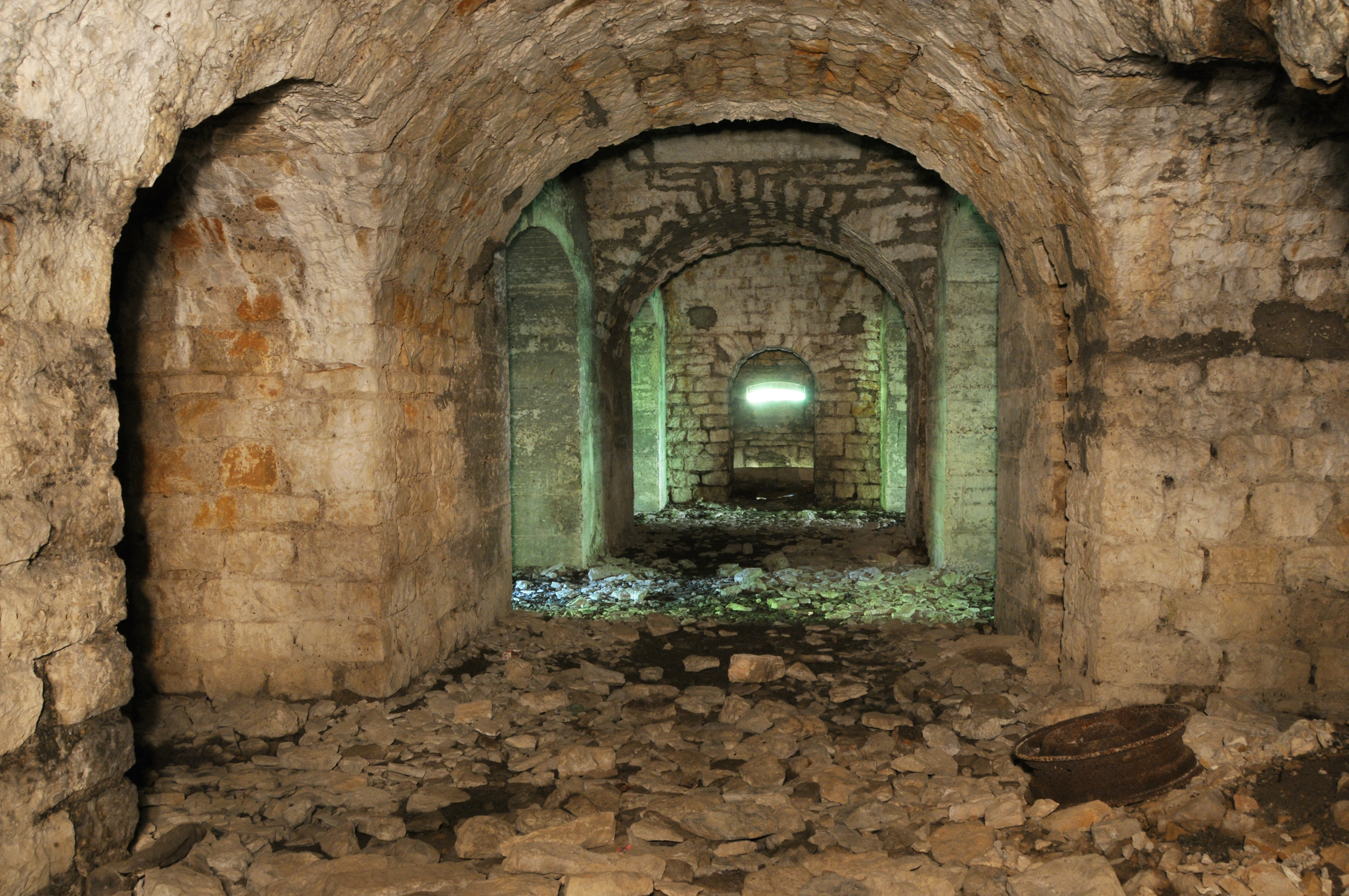
Abandoned Salbert fortifications

Urban exploration (often shortened as urbex or urban ex, and sometimes known as roof and tunnel hacking) is the exploration of manmade structures, usually abandoned ruins or hidden components of the built environment. Photography and historical documentation are heavily featured in the hobby, generally involving trespassing onto private property.

Urban exploration is also called draining (exploring storm drains or sewers), urban spelunking, urban rock climbing, urban caving, building hacking, or mousing.

The activity presents risks including physical danger, the possibility of arrest and punishment if done illegally and/or without permission, and other hazards. Some activities associated with urban exploration may violate local or regional laws, certain broadly interpreted anti-terrorism laws, or can be considered trespassing or invasion of privacy. Encountering squatters in abandoned or unmonitored properties can lead to unpredictable and potentially dangerous situations.

== History ==
=== Early Urban exploration ===
By the early 1800s, the Catacombs of Paris were a popular site for urban exploration. Philibert Aspairt died in the Catacombs in 1793 and his remains were only discovered in 1804. Unofficial explorers, known as "cataphiles," held secret concerts and painted murals within the Catacombs throughout the 19th century.

In 1861, the poet Walt Whitman recounted his exploration of the Atlantic Avenue Tunnel in Brooklyn.

=== Suicide Club ===
Urban exploration in its organized form has been traced to the Suicide Club, a San Francisco–based group founded in 1977. The group engaged in activities such as exploring abandoned or restricted urban environments, street theater, and immersive role-playing events. Although active for only five years, the Suicide Club is regarded as one of the earliest organized groups to pursue exploration of the urban landscape as a recreational and social activity.

== Exploration sites ==
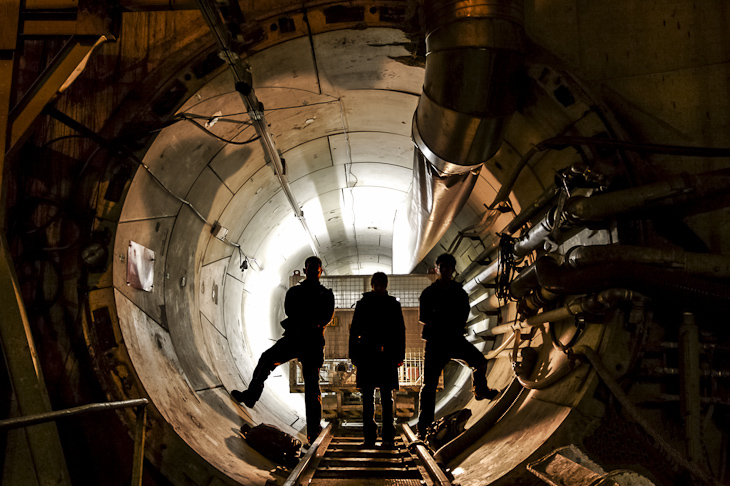
Urban explorers at the entrance of a technical gallery under construction in Paris, France

=== Abandonments ===
Ventures into abandoned structures are perhaps the most common example of urban exploration. Many sites are entered first by locals and may have graffiti or other kinds of vandalism, while others are better preserved. High-profile abandonments include amusement parks, grain elevators, factories, power plants, fallout shelters, hospitals, asylums, prisons, schools, abandoned skyscrapers, poor houses, and sanatoriums.

In Japan, abandoned infrastructure is known as haikyo (廃墟) (literally "ruins"), and the term is synonymous with urban exploration. Haikyo are common due to rapid industrialization (e.g., Hashima Island), damage during World War II, the 1980s real estate bubble, and natural disasters such as the 2011 Tōhoku earthquake and tsunami.

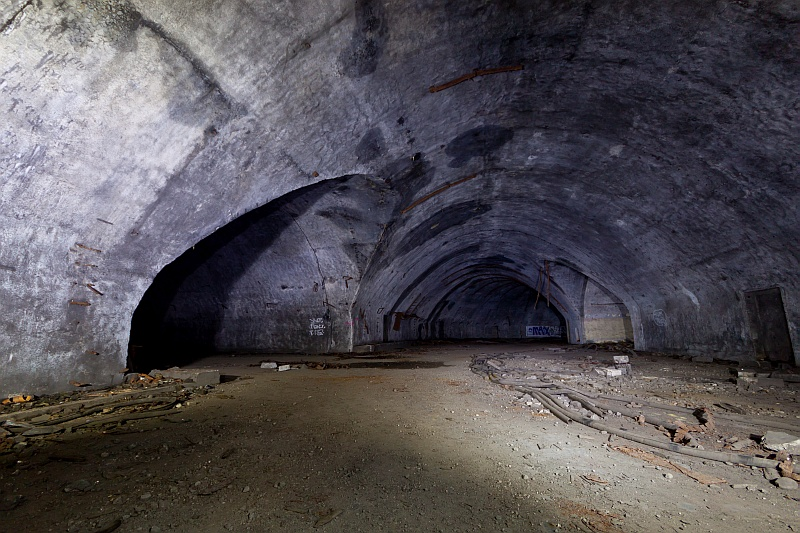
Željava underground military airport

In Bosnia and Herzegovina, a large underground facility abandoned since 1992 is the Željava Air Base, situated under the Gola Plješevica mountain near Bihać. It was the largest underground airport and military air base in the SFR Yugoslavia, and one of the largest in Europe. The complex contains 3.5 km (2.2 mi) of tunnels and other large facilities. It is now a popular urban exploration site, though risky due to possible landmines left from the Bosnian War.

Many explorers find the decay of uninhabited space aesthetically compelling, and some document these sites through photography, including those exploring former USSR infrastructure.

Abandoned sites are also popular among historians, preservationists, architects, archaeologists, industrial archaeologists, ghost hunters, and photographers.

=== Active buildings ===
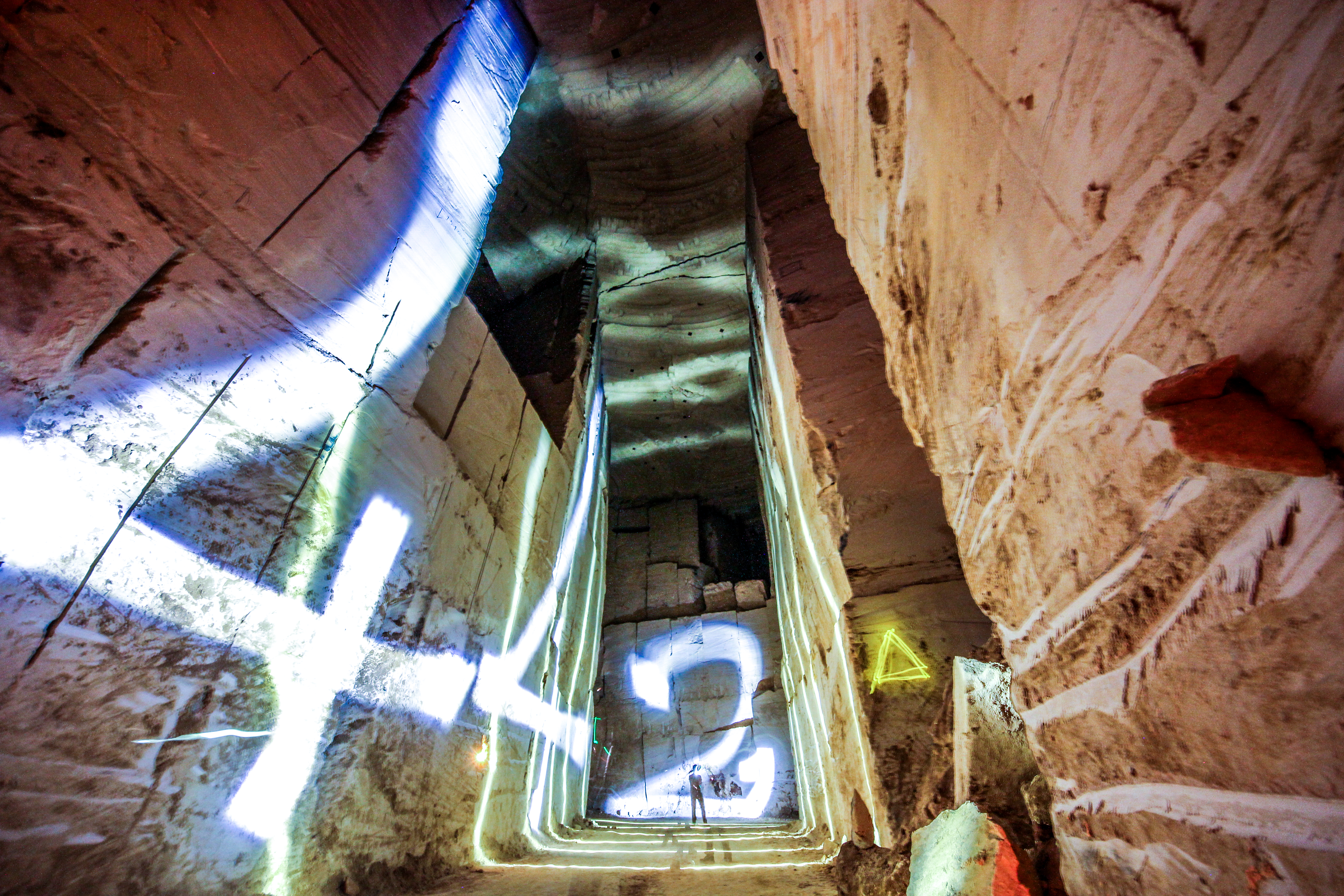
Light painting inside an abandoned limestone quarry in France

Another aspect of urban exploration is the practice of exploring active or in use buildings, which includes gaining access to secured or "member-only" areas, mechanical rooms, roofs, elevator rooms, abandoned floors, and other normally unseen parts of working buildings. The term "infiltration" is often associated with exploring active structures. People entering restricted areas may be committing trespass, and civil prosecution may result. One notable instance of the urban exploration of active buildings occurred in 2007, when the French urban exploration group les UX carried out a clandestine operation to repair and restore the Panthéon's clock, which had stood inoperable for several decades. The group were able to conduct the repair work in secret, having infiltrated the building and set up a workshop inside a cavity under the Panthéon's dome.

=== Catacombs ===
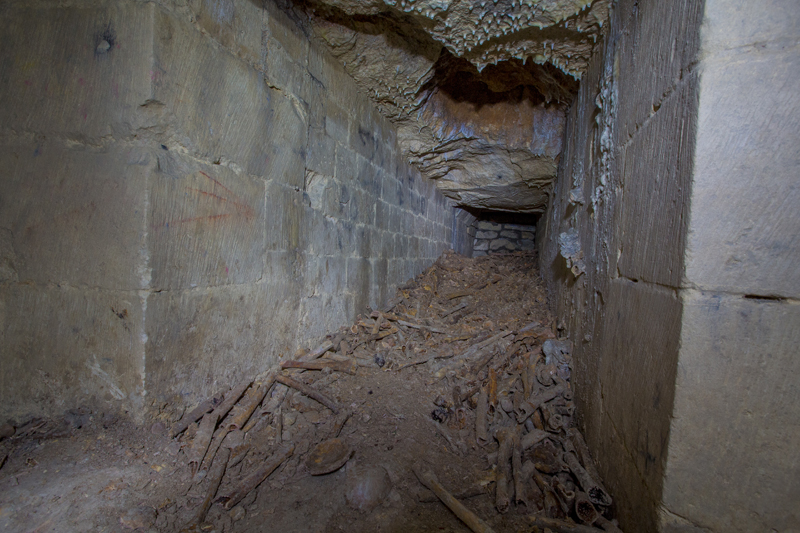
Catacombs (France)

Catacombs such as those found in Paris, Rome, Odessa, and Naples have been investigated by urban explorers. Some consider the Mines of Paris, comprising many of the tunnels that are not open to public tours, including the catacombs, the "Holy Grail" due to their extensive nature and history. Explorers of these spaces are known as cataphiles.

=== Sewers and storm drains ===
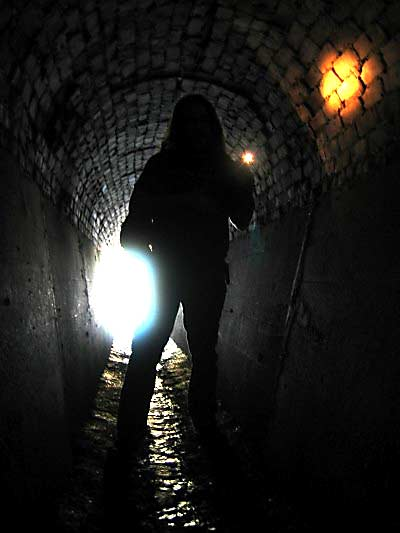
Storm drain outfall in Saint Paul, Minnesota

Entry into storm drains, or "draining", is another common form of urban exploration. Groups devoted to the task have arisen, such as the Cave Clan. Draining has a specialized set of guidelines, the foremost of which is "When it rains, no drains!", because the dangers of becoming entrapped, washed away, or killed increase dramatically during heavy rainfall.

A small subset of explorers enter sanitary sewers. Sometimes, they are the only connection to caves or other subterranean features. Sewers are among the most dangerous locations to explore owing to the risk of poisoning by buildups of toxic gas (commonly methane, hydrogen sulfide, or carbon dioxide). Sewers can contain viruses, bacteria, protozoa, and parasitic worms. Protective equipment is recommended for people who enter sewers.

=== Transit tunnels ===
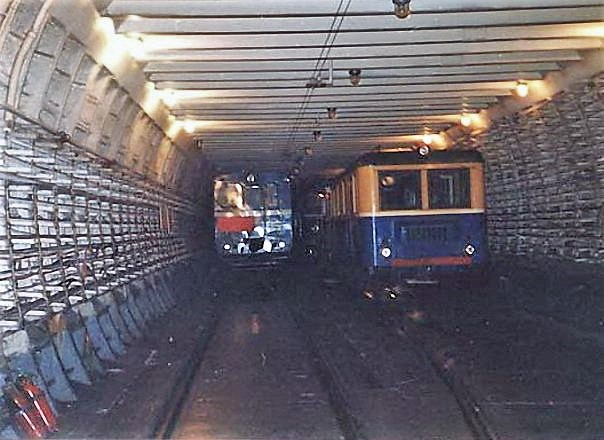
Diesel trains in a tunnel of Metro-2 D6 line in Moscow, Russia

Exploring active and abandoned subway and railway tunnels, bores, and stations is often considered trespassing and can result in civil prosecution due to security concerns. As a result, this type of exploration is rarely publicized. An exception to this is the abandoned subway of Rochester, New York, the only American city with an abandoned subway system that was once operational. The Cincinnati subway is also abandoned but was never completed. London has a number of stations on the London Underground network that have been closed over the years, with Aldwych tube station a popular location for explorers.

=== Utility tunnels ===
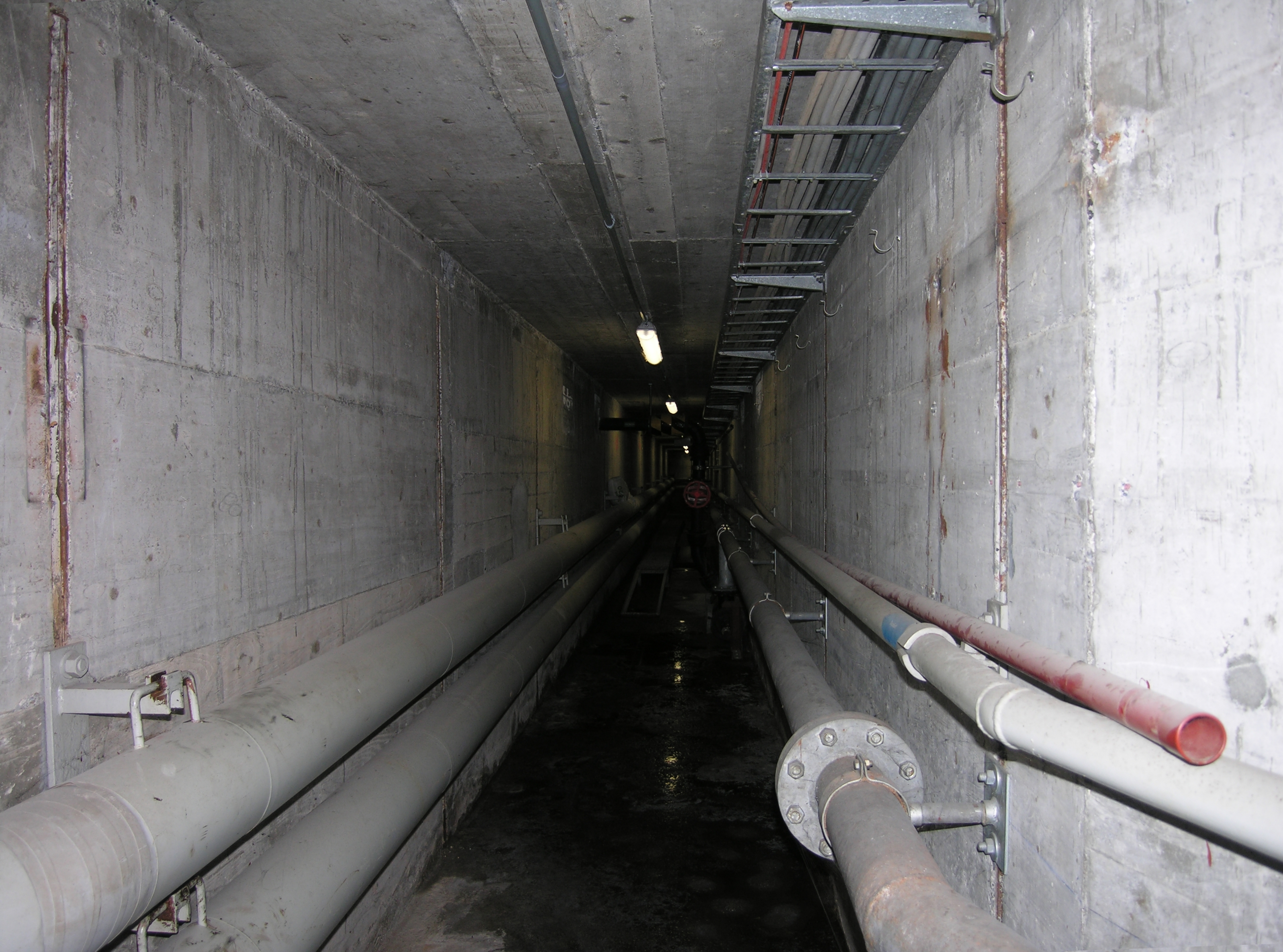
Utility tunnel in the center of Zürich, Switzerland

Universities, and other large institutions, such as hospitals, often distribute hazardous superheated steam for heating or cooling buildings from a central heating plant. These pipes are generally run through utility tunnels, which are often intended to be accessible solely for the purposes of maintenance. Nevertheless, many of these steam tunnels, especially those on college campuses, have a tradition of exploration by students. This practice was once called "vadding" at the Massachusetts Institute of Technology, but students there now call it roof and tunnel hacking.

Some steam tunnels have dirt floors, poor lighting and temperatures above 45 °C (113 °F). Others have concrete floors, bright light, and more moderate temperatures. Most steam tunnels have large intake fans to bring in the fresh air and push the hot air out the back, and these may start without warning. Most active steam tunnels do not contain airborne asbestos, but proper breathing protection may be required for other respiratory hazards. Experienced explorers are very cautious inside active utility tunnels since pipes can spew boiling hot water or steam from leaky valves or pressure relief blow-offs. Often, there are puddles of muddy water on the floor, making slips and falls a special concern near hot pipes.

Steam tunnels have generally been secured more heavily in recent years due to their frequent use for carrying communications network backbone cables, increased safety and liability concerns, and perceived risk of use in terrorist activities.

== Popularity ==
The rise in urban exploration's popularity can be attributed to increased media attention. Recent television shows such as Urban Explorers on the Discovery Channel, MTV's Fear, and the Ghost Hunting exploits of The Atlantic Paranormal Society have packaged the hobby for a popular audience. The fictional film After... (2006), a hallucinatory thriller set in Moscow's underground subways, features urban explorers caught up in extreme situations. Talks and exhibits on urban exploration have appeared at the fifth and sixth Hackers on Planet Earth Conference, complementing numerous newspaper articles and interviews.

Another source of popular information is Cities of the Underworld, a documentary series that ran for three seasons on the History Channel starting in 2007. This series roamed around the world, showing little-known underground structures in remote locales and right under the feet of densely packed city-dwellers. Websites for professional and hobby explorers have been developed to share tips and locations.

With the rise in the hobby's popularity, there has been increasing discussion about whether the extra attention has been beneficial.

== Legality ==
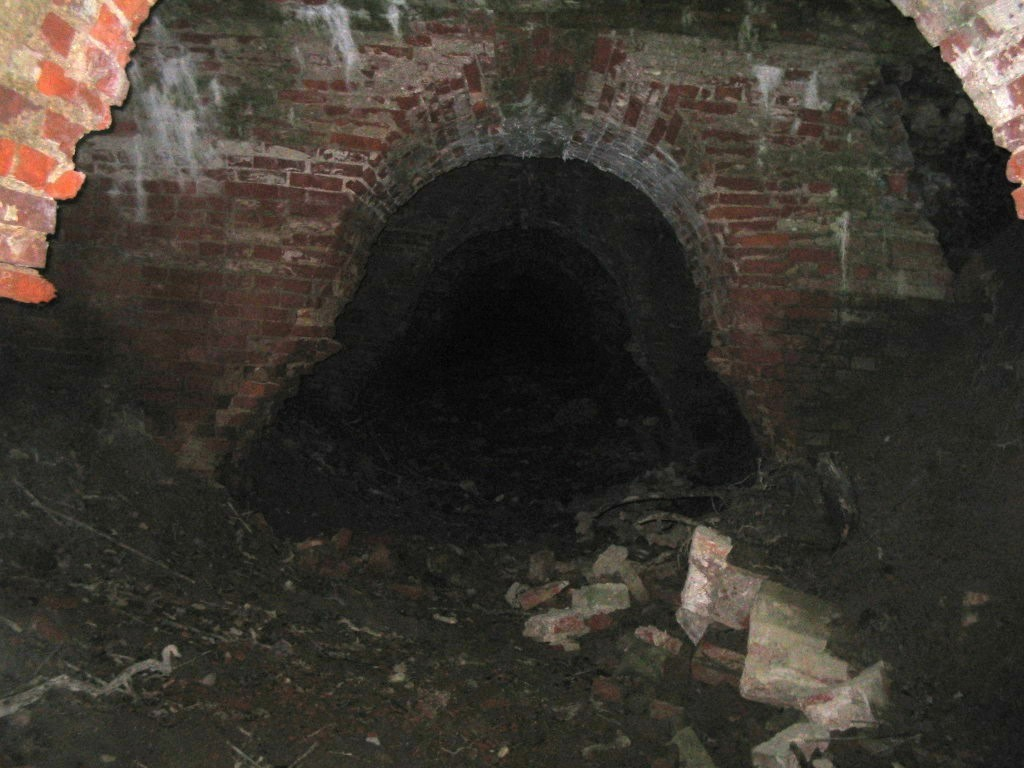
A partially collapsed tunnel in the Kyminlinna fortress in Kotka, Finland

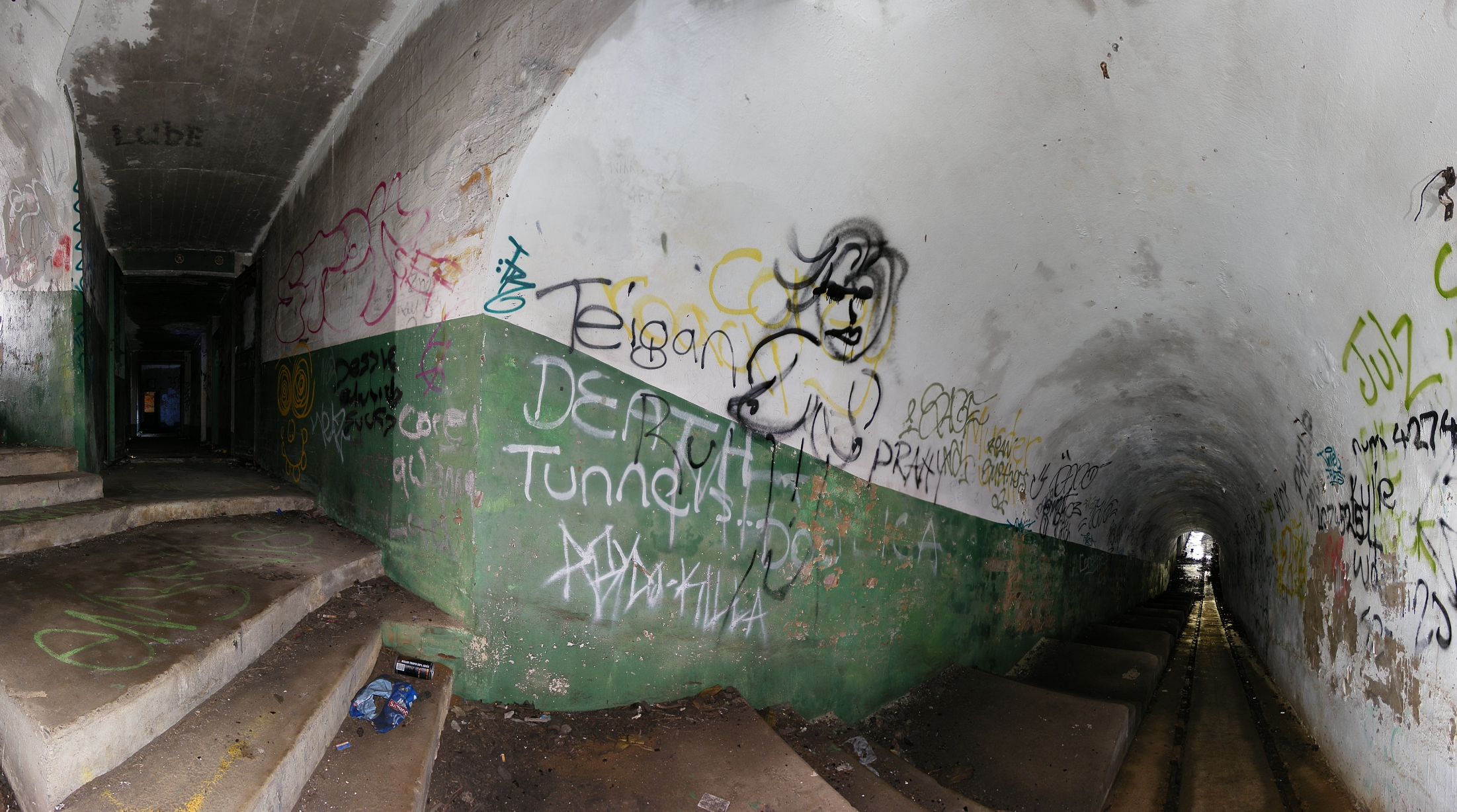
Hill 60 bunker. On the right is a corridor leading to the bunker complex, and on the left is the "mushroom tunnel".

The activity's growing popularity has resulted in increased attention not just from explorers but also from vandals and law enforcement. The illicit aspects of urban exploring, which may include trespassing and breaking and entering, have had critical attention in mainstream newspapers. Sometimes, security or police of buildings can let explorers off with a warning, but can differ depending if explorers have caused further legal troubles.

In Australia, lawyers for the Roads and Traffic Authority of New South Wales shut down the Sydney Cave Clan's website after they raised concerns that the portal could "risk human safety and threaten the security of its infrastructure". Another website belonging to the Bangor Explorers Guild was criticized by the Maine State Police for encouraging behavior that "could get someone hurt or killed". Toronto Police, who have called for an "end" to rooftop photography in 2016, citing similar concerns about the possibility of death or injury. The Toronto Transit Commission has used the Internet to crimp subway tunnel explorations, going as far as to send investigators to various explorers' homes.

Jeff Chapman, who authored Infiltration, writes that genuine urban explorers "never vandalize, steal or damage anything". The thrill comes from "discovery and a few nice pictures". Some explorers also request permission for entry in advance.

== Hazards ==
Storm drains are not designed with human access as their primary use and can be subject to flash flooding and poor air quality.

Many abandoned structures have hazards such as unstable structures, unsafe floors, broken glass, stray voltage, entrapment hazards, or unknown chemicals and other harmful substances (most notably asbestos). Other risks include freely roaming guard dogs and hostile squatters.

== Alarms, security and legal notification ==
Urban exploration sites often still have active security systems even when they look abandoned. Many buildings use basic motion sensor, door sensors, and cameras that can trigger alarms. These alarms may alert the owner, call police, or notify on-site private security to check the property. Because power is sometimes still connected, explorers are often surprised by how quickly these systems activate, making security a major factor in urban exploring.

=== Deaths from urban exploration ===
Date	Location	Description
June 2008	Toronto, Canada	A 26-year-old man died in hospital two days after falling off a catwalk at the abandoned Richard L. Hearn Thermal Generating Station in Toronto. The man entered the building with a friend intending to take "artistic photographs" of the building.
26 April 2009	Saint Paul, United States	A man was inside a tunnel along the Mississippi river when it began to rain heavily, and the rain swept him down the tunnel to the river. The man was found in the river and later died in hospital, having drowned.
June 2013	Neman, Russia	It is thought that a 9-year-old boy fell 6 metres (20 ft) from a spiral staircase to the ground inside the ruins of Ragnit Castle and died from his injuries.
21 March 2015	Brisbane, Australia	A man was kayaking through a stormwater drain when he became trapped by rising water from heavy rain and drowned.
May 2016	Fremantle, Western Australia	A 24-year-old man fell to his death following a floor collapse in the South Fremantle Power Station.
12 January 2017	La Mulatière, France	An 18-year-old boy was on Mulatière railway bridge taking photos, when he fell from the bridge and died.
October 2017	Chicago, United States	A Memphis photographer and urban explorer died after a 14-story fall off a hotel in Chicago while trespassing.
June 2018	Philadelphia, United States	A 30-year-old photographer and urban explorer died in Philadelphia after being swept away in a flash flood while exploring a storm drain.
August 2019	Yekaterinburg, Russia	A 16-year-old boy was walking on the roof of a one-story abandoned building and was killed when the edge of the building collapsed.
July 2020	Totnes, United Kingdom	A 22-year-old man died after falling from the roof of an abandoned factory.
September 2021	Moscow, Russia	A 34-year-old YouTuber suffered a fatal fall while filming a YouTube video in an abandoned building in Moscow.

== Rooftopping ==
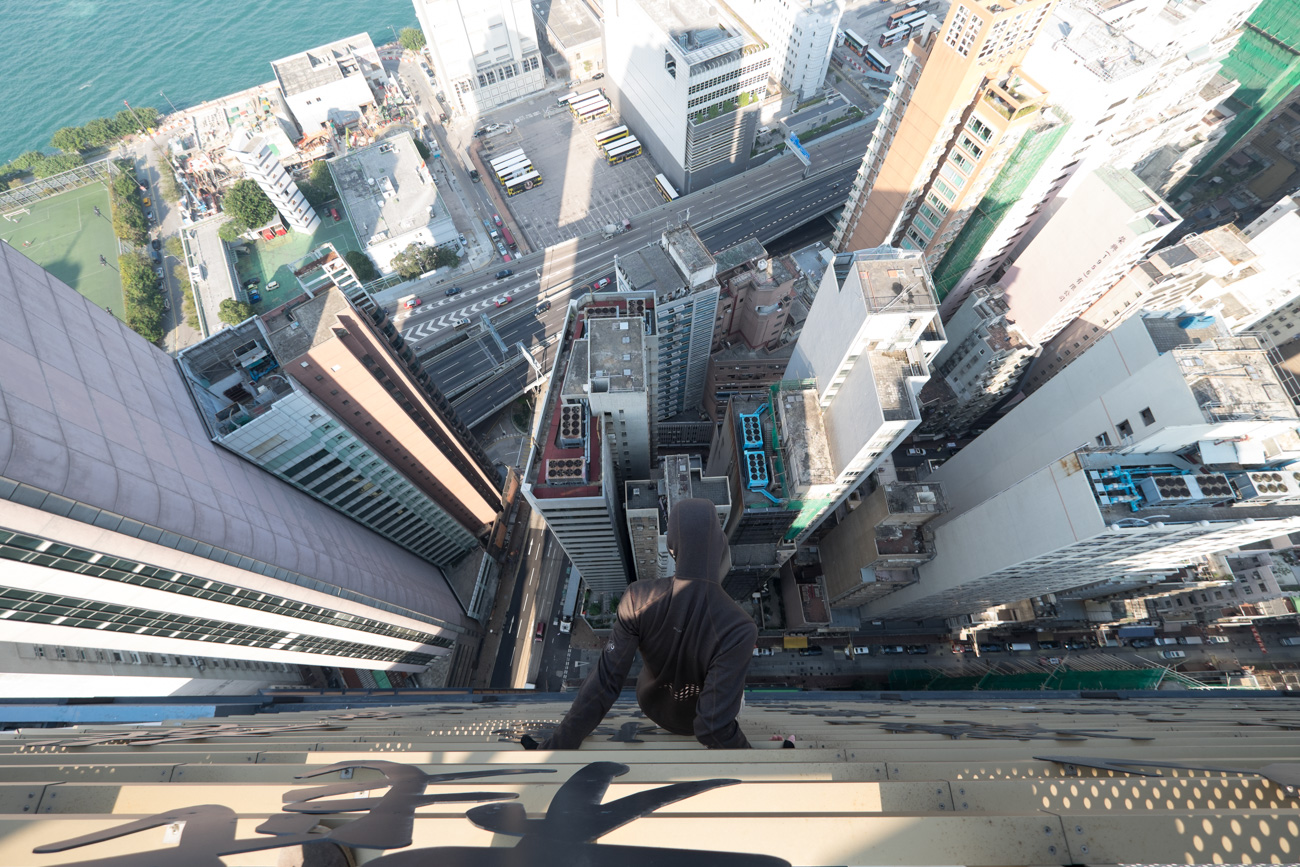
Rooftopping in Hong Kong

Rooftopping and skywalking are the ascents of rooftops, cranes, antennas, smokestacks, telecommunications towers, etc., usually illegally, to get an adrenaline rush and take selfie photos or videos. Rooftopping differs from skywalking as the latter is mostly about taking panoramic photographs of the scene below, and safety is more important than the thrill. Rooftopping has been especially popular in Russia. Buildering has a similar goal as rooftopping and skywalking (to reach the roof), but involves climbing the building from the outside rather than infiltrating from the inside.

== Methods and technology ==
- Some urban explorers use action cameras such as GoPro or other helmet cameras for videos.
- Some also use quadcopter drones for exploration and recording.
- The location-based games Ingress and the following Pokémon Go based on the former have urban exploration elements. While some are concerned with keeping certain sites secret from the public at large, mainly to prevent vandalism, several apps dedicated to urban exploration exist.

== See also ==
=== General ===
- Industrial tourism
- Modern ruins
- Abandoned graveyard
- Abandoned mine
- Abandoned railway
- Abandoned shopping plaza
- List of defunct amusement parks

=== Organizations ===
- Cave Clan, Australian urbex group
