= Lutetian limestone =

Type of limestone from Paris

- Stratigraphic range: Middle Eocene (Lutetian) 48–40 Ma
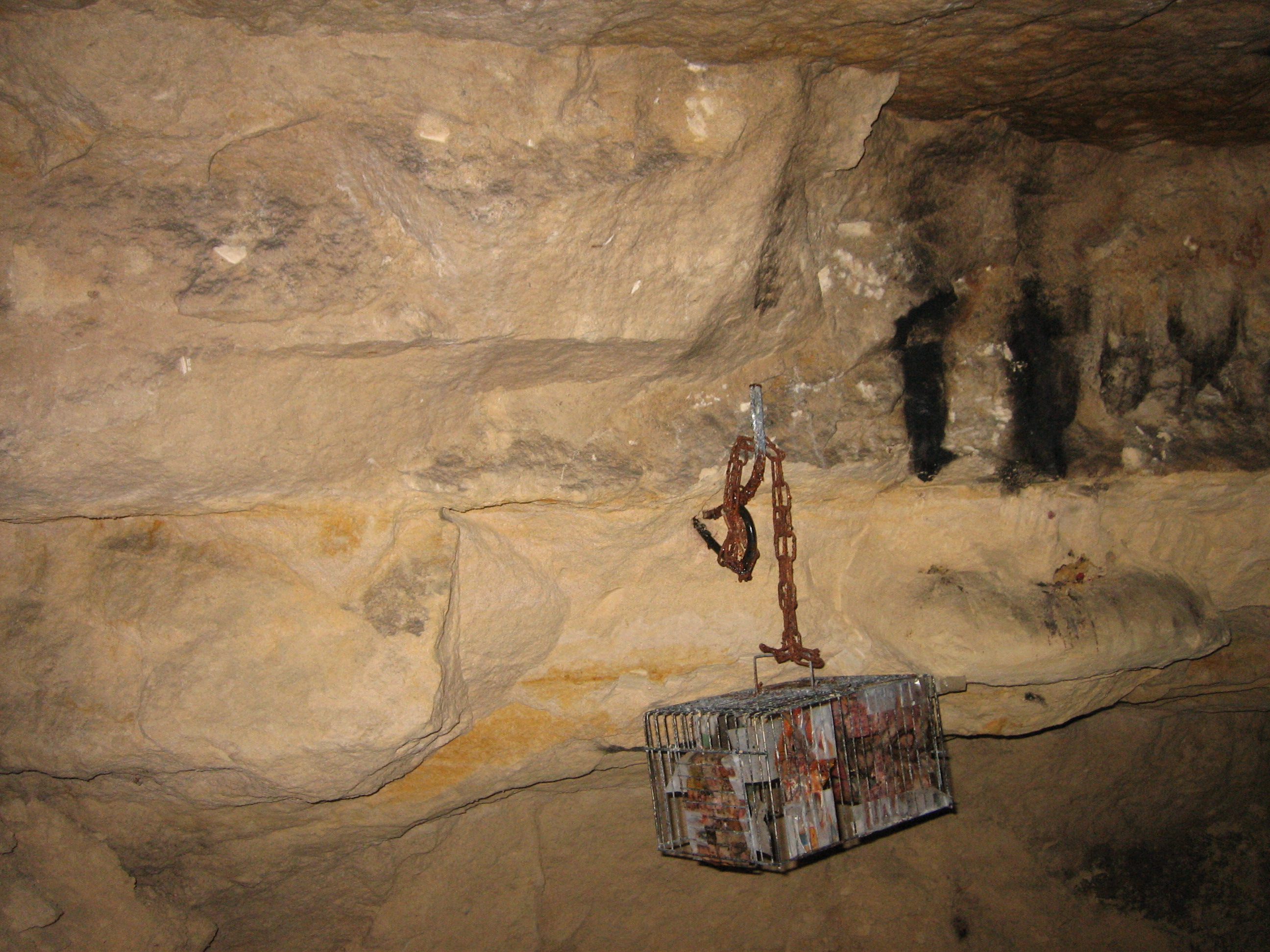
- The Paris Catacombs tunnel through many miles of Lutetian limestone.
- Type: Sedimentary
- Unit of: Paris Basin

Lithology
- Primary: Limestone

Location
- Region: Île-de-France, Hauts-de-France, Grand Est
- Country: France

Type section
- Named for: Lutetia (Roman name for Paris)

Lutetian limestone (in French, calcaire lutécien, and formerly calcaire grossier) — also known as “Paris stone” — is a variety of limestone particular to the Eocene-aged deposits in the Paris Basin of France, most notably underlying the city of Paris. It has been a source of wealth as an economic and versatile building material since ancient Roman times (see Mines of Paris) and has contributed markedly to the unique visual appeal of the “City of Light”. It has been hailed as “the warm, elusive, cream-grey stone of the French capital”. In addition to Paris, the Lutetian limestone also extends north and eastwards through France, and has also been mined in areas such as Rheims, Laon and Soissons.

Its formation dates to the Eocene epoch's Lutetian age, between 48.07 and 41.03 Ma. The name "Lutetian" derives from Lutetia (French, Lutèce) which was the name of Paris in ancient times. The Lutetian age was named after the limestone of this region.

The limestone consists of two different ages and depositional environments: a marine limestone deposited during the middle Lutetian (the iconic calcaire grossier) and a slightly younger freshwater limestone (alongside marl) deposited on top of the marine limestones during the later Lutetian, when the seas had receded.

== History ==
Between the 17th and 19th centuries, Lutetian limestone was extracted by tunneling through hill-sides south of Paris. The stone comprises many of the grandest Paris buildings from the 17th century onwards, including parts of the Louvre, the Place de la Concorde, Les Invalides and the Arc de Triomphe

Haussmann's grand renovation of Paris (1853–1870), which provided a sweeping and uniform style and an elusive coloring — ranging from bright white to butter-yellow to a dull nicotine-yellow/grey — for Paris, relied upon buildings faced with Lutetian limestone.

In the 20th century, open-cast quarries were developed north of Paris, which uncovered thinner layers of harder limestone closer to the surface. A now fashionable variety of Lutetian limestone from about 25 miles north of Paris is known as “Oise stone” or "Saint-Maximin limestone" and has become popular internationally for upscale building projects. In 2007, the quarries in southern Oise, around Saint-Maximin and Chantilly, applied to the French government to become the first to be granted a building stone Appellation Contrôlée – the badge of official French regional excellence – similar to the provenance system for wine or a cheese.

According to a 2007 article in the UK's The Independent: “The harder, sliceable limestone sells for around €2,000 a cubic metre. The different grades of softer building stone sell for between €550 and €150 a cubic metre, which is very competitive with other building stone all around the world.”

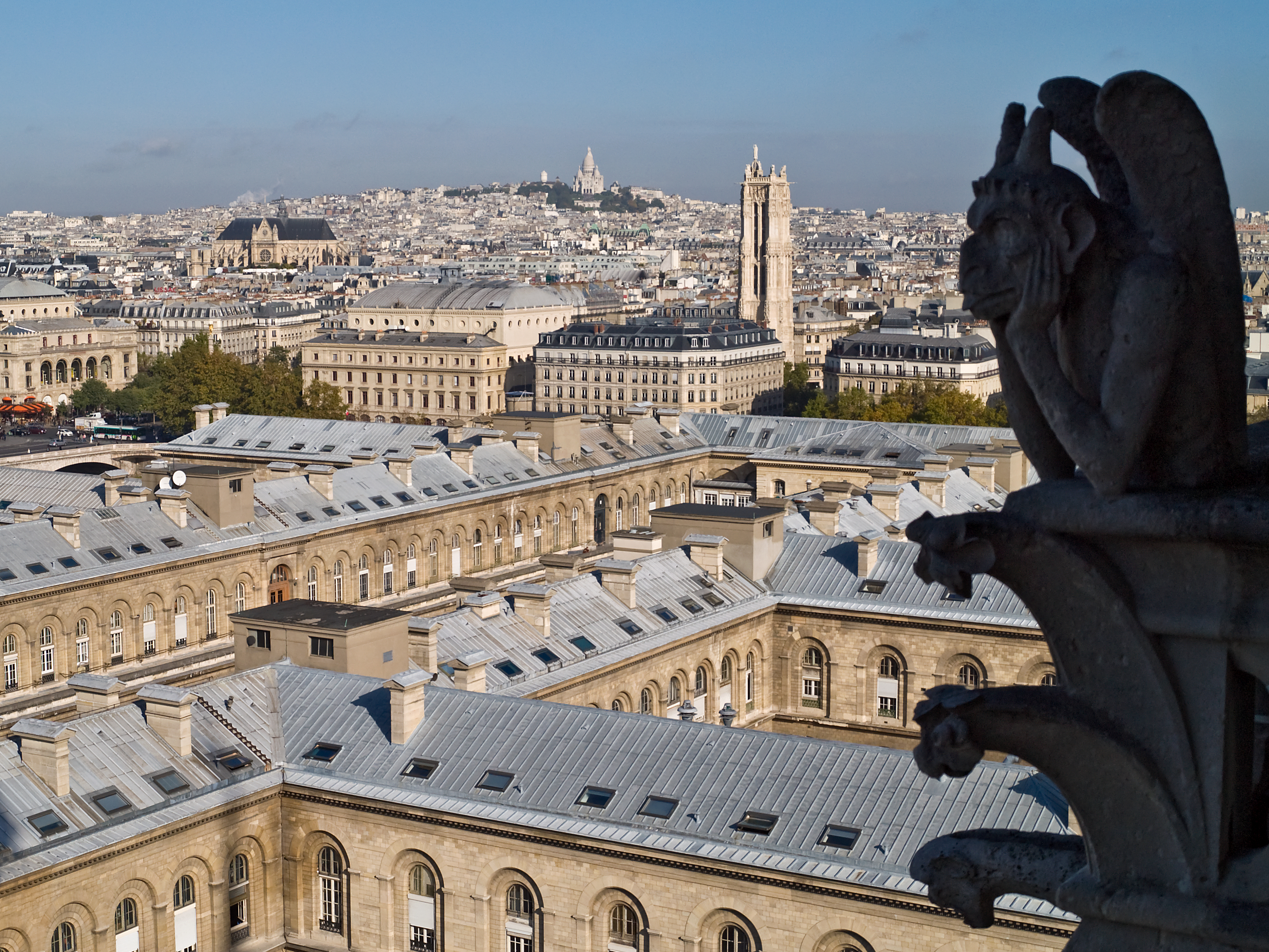
The "City of Light" owes much of its uniformity and visual appeal to the many buildings faced with Lutetian Limestone.

== See also ==
- List of types of limestone
