= Les UX =

Underground municipal-improvement group

The UX (short for Urban eXperiment) is an underground organization of urban explorers who improve hidden corners of Paris. Their work includes undercover efforts to repair and restore the Panthéon's clock, building a cinema — complete with a bar and a restaurant — in a section of the Paris Catacombs underneath the Trocadéro, restoring medieval crypts, and staging plays and readings in monuments after dark. The group's membership is largely secret, but its spokespeople include Lazar Kunstmann.

== History ==
With its start in September 1981, the founders of the group stole plans of the many underground passageways and tunnels for which Paris is famous. Using this information as a base, the group of anonymous artists and citizens has since restored much of Paris's underground infrastructure, including the Panthéon clock, which chimed for the first time in many years after its repair. The group is also responsible for over a dozen other projects, including those which the French government has not chosen to do or for which they lack funds.

== Organization ==
The organization is divided into teams: an all-female team (the Mouse House) specializing in infiltration, a team running an internal messaging system and coded radio network, a team providing a database, a team (La Mexicaine De Perforation) organizing underground shows, a team doing photography, a team (Lyonnaise des Os) who explores the catacombs and create sculptures, and a team (Untergunther) undertaking restoration work with the help of architects and historians.

== Projects ==
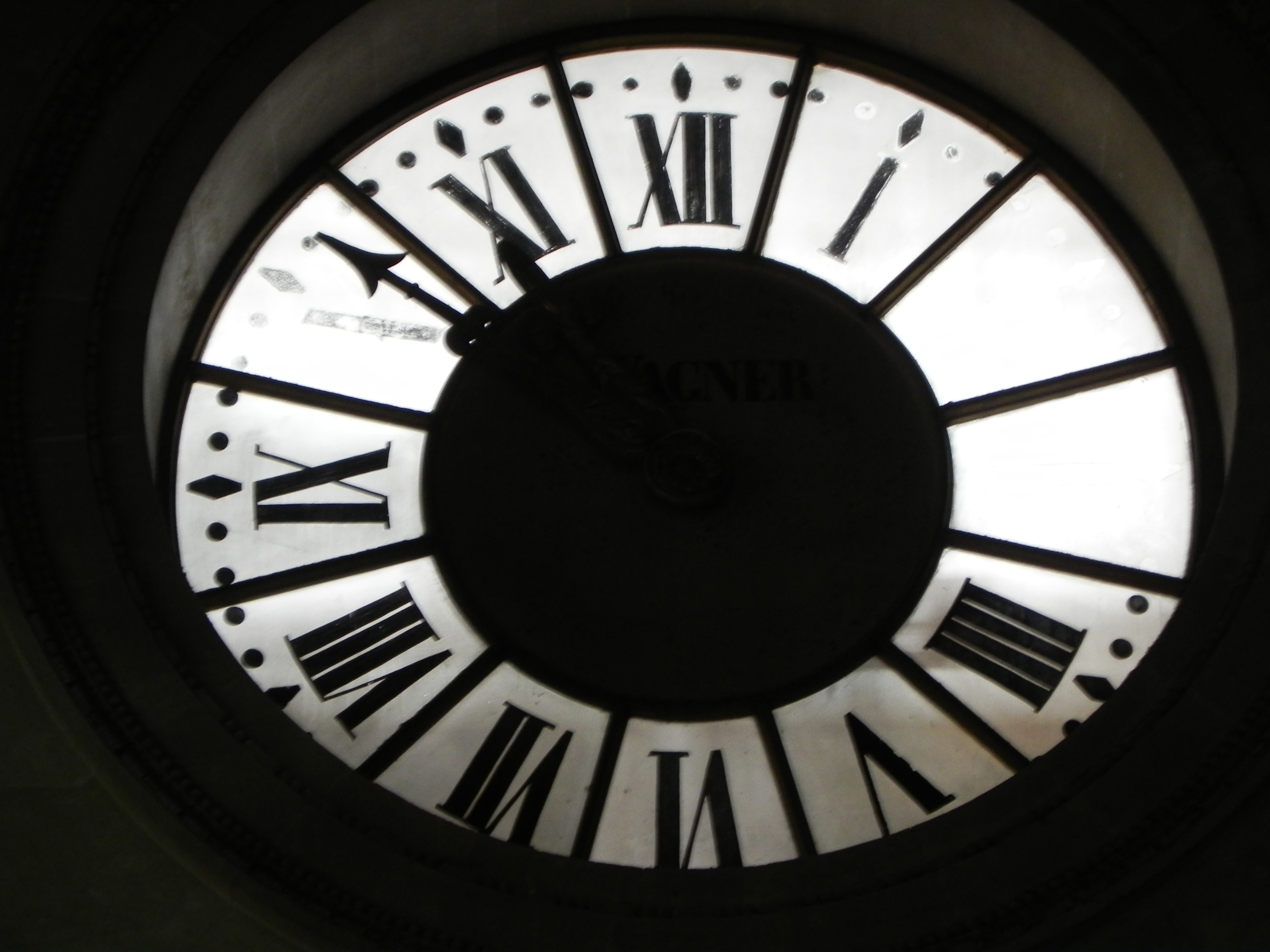
The clock in the Panthéon de Paris, photographed in 2010. The clock's hands remained at 10:51 for some years following the Untergunther repair.

In October 2007, the Untergunther team received attention for a project to clandestinely restore the famous clock in the Panthéon which had been out of commission since the 1960s. They were assisted by professional clockmaker Jean-Baptiste Viot, installing a workshop for him beneath the building's dome. The team were not caught, and upon completion they announced their work to the building's administrator, after which the Centre des Monuments Nationaux sought unsuccessfully to prosecute them.

In September 2004, French police discovered an underground movie theatre run by La Mexicaine De Perforation (The Mexican Consolidated Drilling Authority). The makeshift theatre contained a movie screen, a well stocked bar, and a kitchen, and was protected by a security system that played a recorded sound of barking dogs. Movie titles ranging from 1950s classics to modern thrillers were also discovered. Electricity and a phone connection had been brought in from an unknown location. When the police returned for a formal investigation, the cinema had been dismantled and the power and phone lines cut — they found a note reading "Ne cherchez pas" ("Do not search [for us]").

== Official reaction ==
Parisian authorities oppose the group's actions and have started a police unit to track the group through the sewers and catacombs of Paris in an attempt to apprehend and charge its members.

Charges were brought by the government against the four Untergunther restorers of the Pantheon clock. At trial, after 20 minutes' deliberation, the judge ruled in the defendants' favor. France has no laws against breaking into public monuments. One of the government's prosecutors referred to the charges as "stupid". One of the Untergunther restorers, Jean-Baptiste Viot, was later appointed as the official restorer of the clock in 2018, with his work during the Untergunther restoration cited as proof of his qualifications.
