= Cataphile =

Illegal urban explorers of the Mines of Paris

Cataphiles are urban explorers who illegally tour the Mines of Paris, a term popularly used to describe a series of tunnels that were built as a network of stone mines, which are no longer used. The Catacombs of Paris comprise a subset of this network.

== Unauthorized visits ==
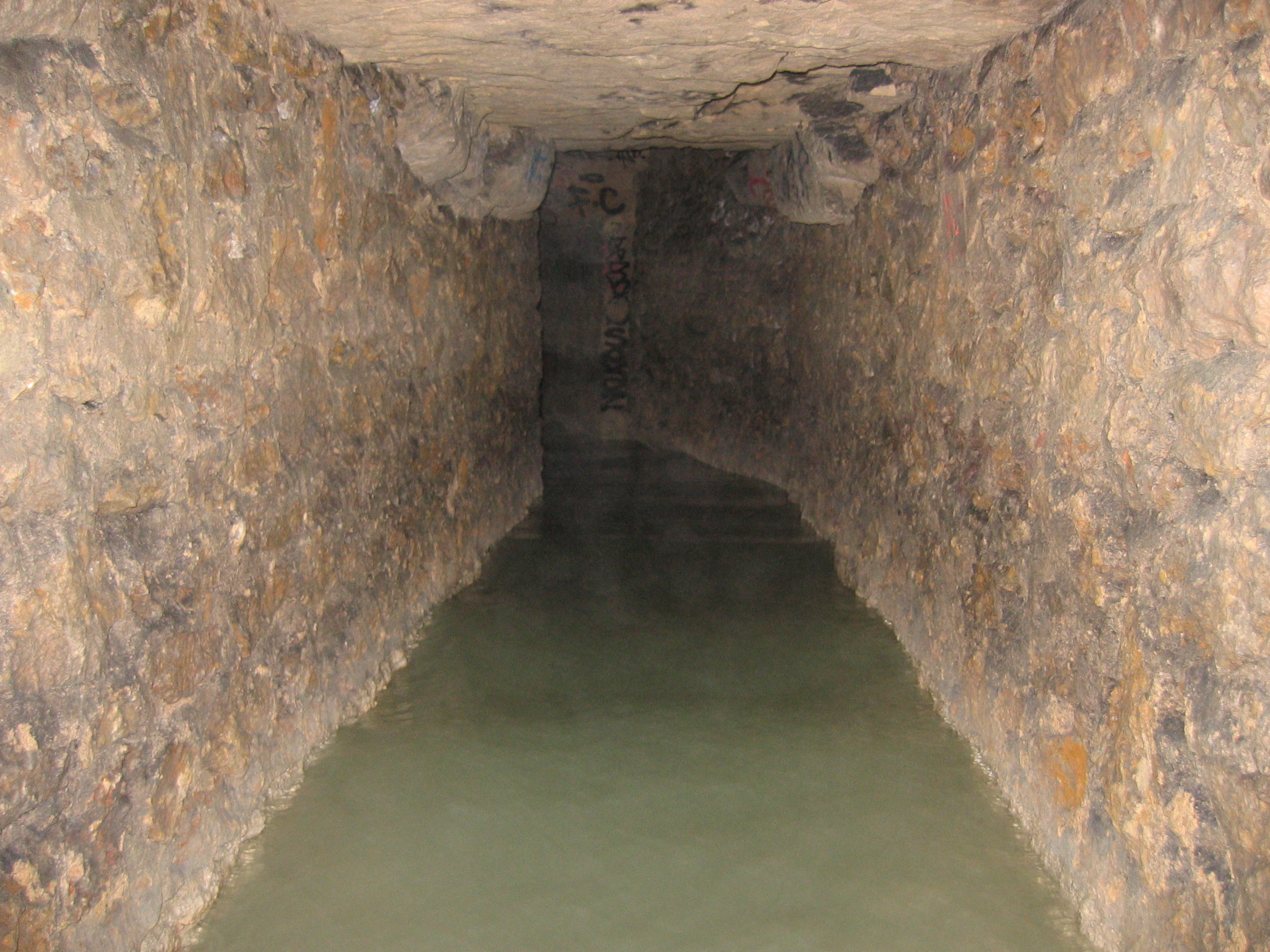
A partially flooded section of rue de la Voie Verte

Entrance to the mines is restricted. The portion open to the public (the catacombs) is only a small part of an extensive network of tunnels, which spans around 280 kilometres (170 mi) in length and criss-crosses large sections of the city. The tunnel system is complex, and though some tunnels have plaques indicating the name of the street above, it is easy to get lost. Some passages are low or narrow, and others are partially flooded. There are aging telephone wires, pipes, and other impediments that can hinder progress, and cave-ins, although rare, do occasionally occur. A good guide is indispensable, and many guides occasionally refer to a map. Because of these dangers, accessing the catacombs without official escort has been illegal since 2 November 1955. There is a €60 fine for people caught by the police who patrol the mines (colloquially known as "cataflics").

Secret entrances exist throughout Paris, and it is sometimes possible to enter the mines via the sewers, metro, and certain manholes.

Some unofficial visitors hold keys to certain official entrances. On rare occasions people use these access points and illegally enter the mines — for example, to meet clandestinely, to search for valuables, to hold unusual parties, or simply as urban explorers.

In September 2004, the French police discovered an underground movie theater run by les UX — a French artistic movement that seeks to convey their ideas using underground places.

Cataphiles often descend for a day, a night, or perhaps a week to explore, photograph, paint murals, create maps, clean up rooms, and dig chatières (very narrow tunnels, that one can only crawl through).

== See also ==
- Inspection générale des carrières
