= Catacombs of Paris =

Underground ossuary in France

- Catacombes de Paris
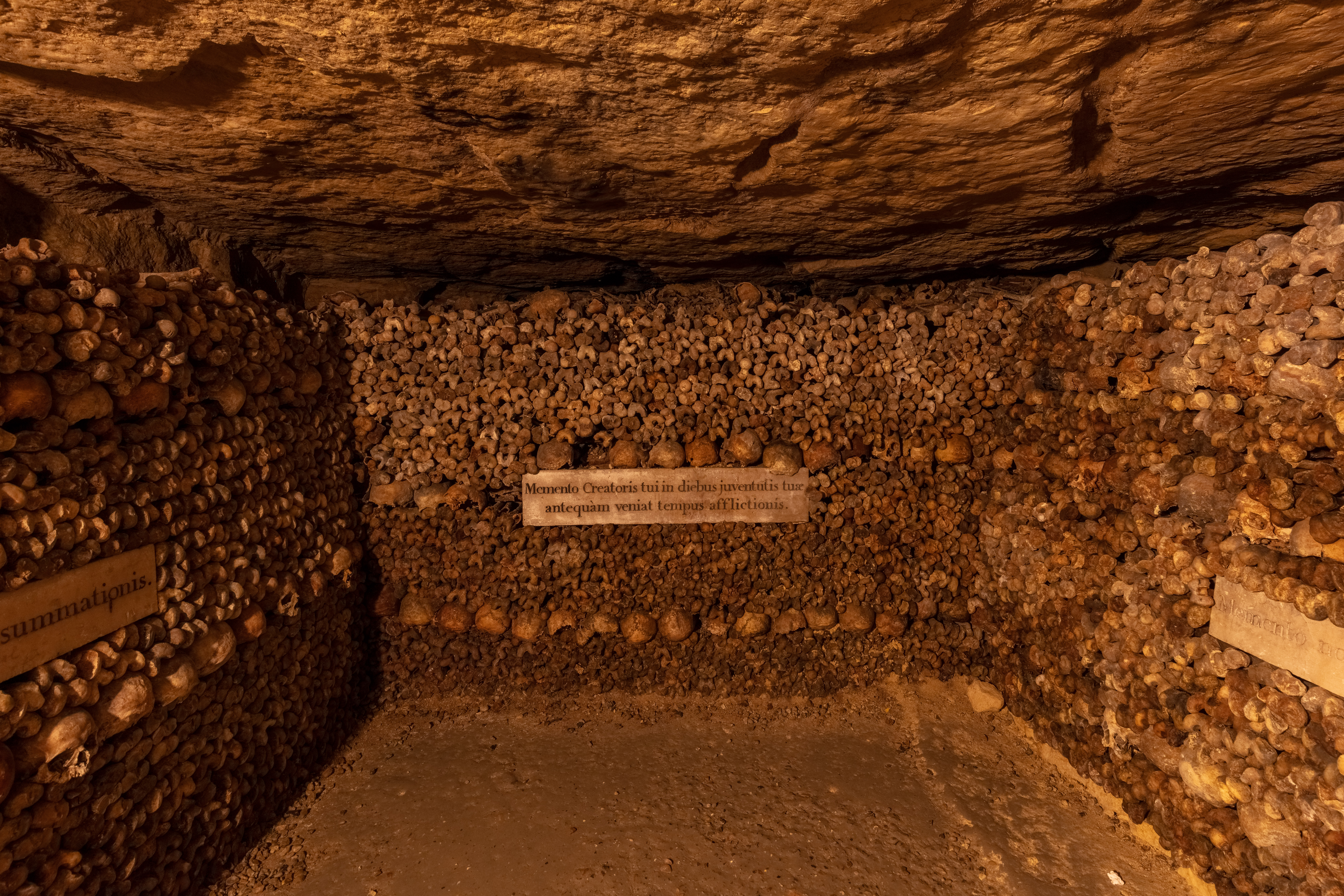
- Crypt of the Sepulchral Lamp in the Catacombs of Paris

- Location within Paris
- Established: 1810
- Location: Place Denfert-Rochereau, 75014 Paris, France
- Coordinates: 48°50′02″N 2°19′56″E
- Type: Historic site
- Collections: Paris's former stone quarries, ossuary contents of Paris's pre-18th-century intra muros cemeteries
- Visitors: 480,000 (2018)
- Public transit access: Denfert-Rochereau
- Website: www.catacombes.paris.fr/en

The Catacombs of Paris (French: Catacombes de Paris,) are underground ossuaries in Paris, France, which hold the remains of more than six million people. Built to consolidate Paris's ancient stone quarries, they extend south from the Barrière d'Enfer ("Gate of Hell") former city gate. The ossuary was created as part of the effort to eliminate the effects of the city's overflowing cemeteries. Preparation work began shortly after a 1774 series of basement wall collapses around the Holy Innocents' Cemetery added a sense of urgency to the cemetery-eliminating measure, and from 1788, nightly processions of covered wagons transferred remains from most of Paris's cemeteries to a mine shaft opened near the Rue de la Tombe-Issoire.

The ossuary remained largely forgotten until it became a novelty-place for concerts and other private events in the early 19th century; after further renovations and the construction of accesses around Place Denfert-Rochereau, it was opened to public visitation from 1874. Since 2013, the Catacombs have numbered among the fourteen City of Paris Museums managed by Paris Musées. Although the ossuary comprises only a small section of the underground mines of Paris, Parisians often refer to the entire tunnel network as the catacombs.

== History ==
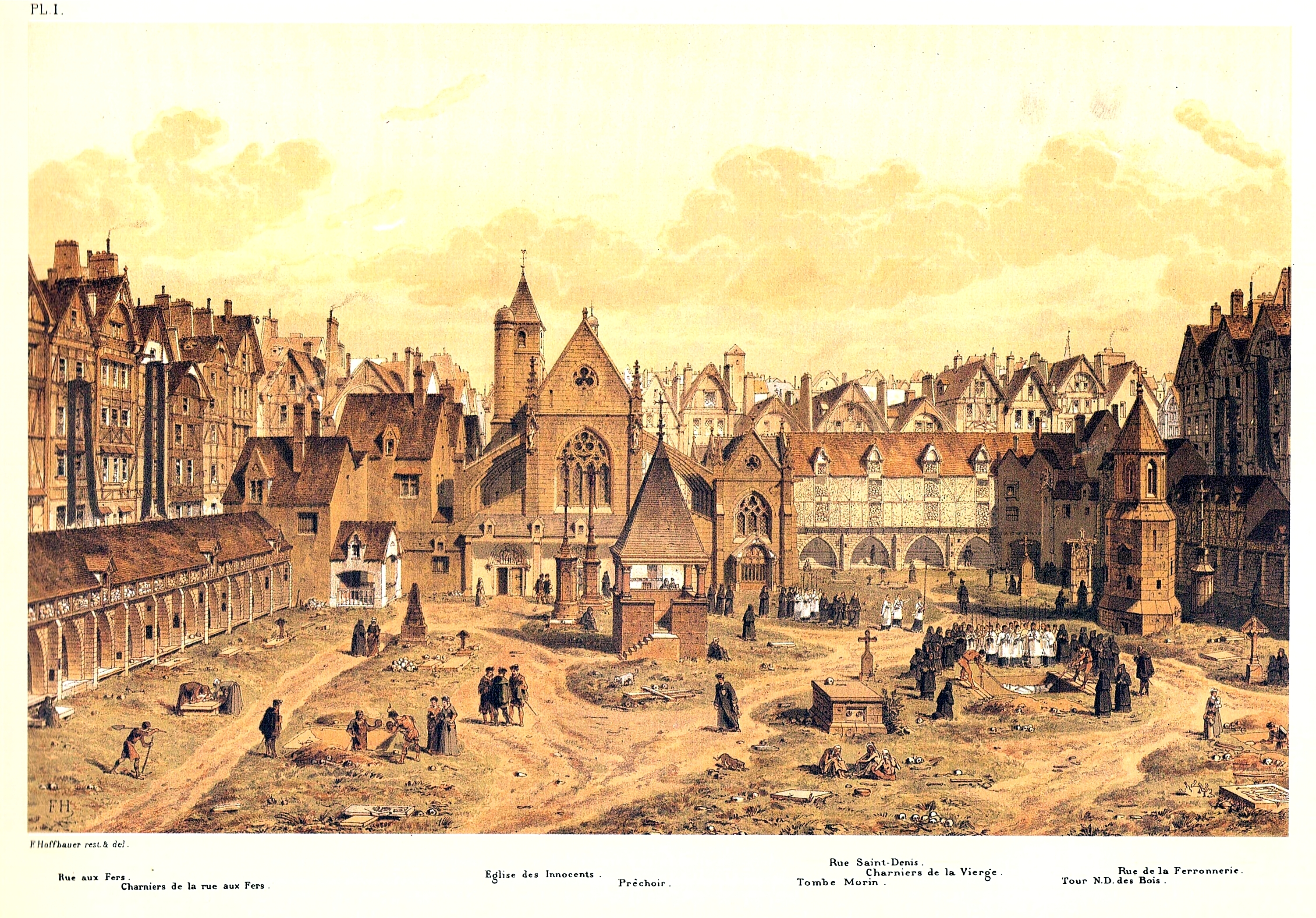
Les Innocents cemetery in 1550

Paris's newest burial grounds were to the southern outskirts of the Roman-era Left Bank city. In ruins after the Western Roman Empire's 5th-century end and the ensuing Frankish invasions, this settlement was eventually abandoned for the marshy Right Bank: from the 4th century, the first known settlement there was on higher ground around a Saint-Etienne church and burial ground (behind the present Hôtel de Ville), and urban expansion on the Right Bank began in earnest after other ecclesiastical landowners filled in the marshlands from the late 10th century. Thus, instead of burying its dead away from inhabited areas as usual, the Paris Right Bank settlement began with cemeteries near its centre.

The most central of these cemeteries, a burial ground around the 5th-century Notre-Dame-des-Bois church, became the property of the Saint-Opportune parish after the original church was demolished by the 9th-century Norman invasions. When it became its own parish associated with the church of the "Saints Innocents" from 1130, this burial ground, filling the land between the present rue Saint-Denis, rue de la Ferronnerie, rue de la Lingerie and the rue Berger, had become the city's principal cemetery. By the end of the same century, Saints Innocents was neighbour to the principal Parisian marketplace Les Halles, and already filled to overflowing. To make room for more burials, the long-dead were exhumed and their bones packed into the roofs and walls of "charnier" galleries built inside the cemetery walls. By the end of the 18th century, the central burial ground was a two-metre-high (6.6-foot) mound of earth filled with centuries of Parisian dead, plus the remains from the Hôtel-Dieu hospital and the Morgue; other Parisian parishes had their own burial grounds, but the conditions in Saints Innocents were the worst.

A series of ineffective decrees limiting the use of the cemetery did little to remedy the situation, and it was not until the late 18th century that it was decided to create three new large-scale suburban burial grounds on the outskirts of the city, and to condemn all existing parish cemeteries within city limits.

=== Future ossuary: Paris's former mines ===
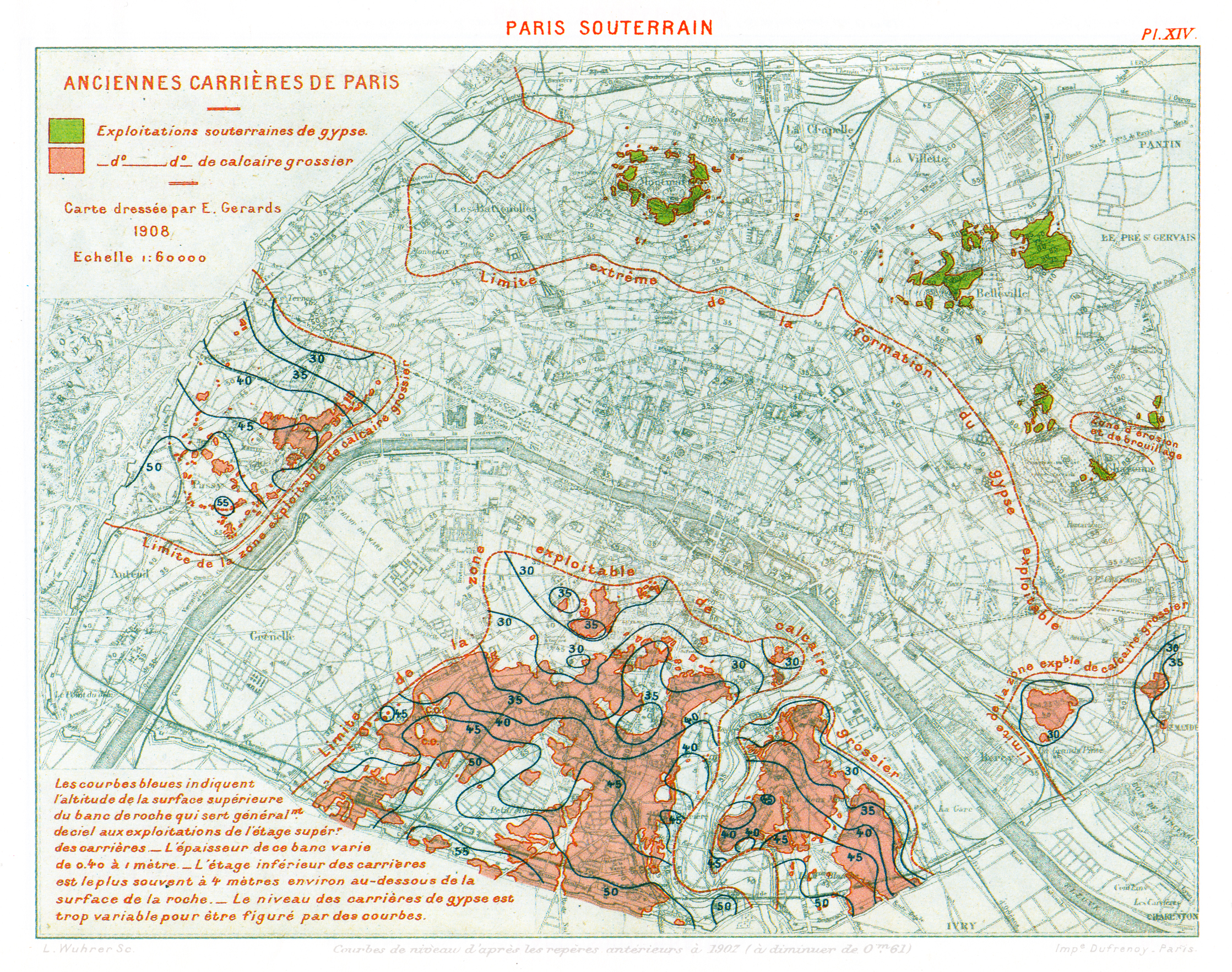
Map of former underground mine exploitations in Paris (1908)

Much of the Left Bank area rests upon rich Lutetian limestone deposits. This stone built much of the city, but it was extracted in suburban locations away from any habitation. Because of the post 12th-century haphazard mining technique of digging wells down to the deposit and extracting it horizontally until depletion, many of these (often illicit) mines were uncharted, and when depleted, often abandoned and forgotten. Paris had annexed its suburbs many times over the centuries, and by the 18th century many of its arrondissements (administrative districts) were or included previously mined territories.

The undermined state of the Left Bank was known to architects as early 17th-century construction of the Val-de-Grâce hospital (most of its building expenses were due to its foundations), but a series of mine cave-ins beginning 1774 with the collapse of a house along the "rue d'Enfer" (near today's crossing of the Avenue Denfert-Rochereau and the boulevard Saint-Michel) caused King Louis XVI to name a commission to investigate the state of the Parisian underground. This resulted in the creation of the inspection Générale des Carrières (General Inspection of Mines) service.

=== Ossuary creation ===
The need to eliminate Les Innocents gained urgency from May 31, 1780, when a basement wall in a property adjoining the cemetery collapsed under the weight of the mass grave behind it. The cemetery was closed to the public and all intra muros (Latin: "within the [city] walls") burials were forbidden after 1780. The problem of what to do with the remains crowding intra muros cemeteries was still unresolved.

Mine consolidations were still occurring and the underground around the site of the 1777 collapse that had initiated the project had already become a series of stone and masonry inspection passageways that reinforced the streets above. The mine renovation and cemetery closures were both issues within the jurisdiction of the Police Prefect Police Lieutenant-General Alexandre Lenoir, who had been directly involved in the creation of a mine inspection service. Lenoir endorsed the idea of moving Parisian dead to the subterranean passageways that were renovated during 1782. After deciding to further renovate the "Tombe-Issoire" passageways for their future role as an underground sepulchre, the idea became law in late 1785.

A well within a walled property above one of the principal subterranean passageways was dug to receive Les Innocents' unearthed remains, and the property itself was transformed into a sort of museum for all the headstones, sculptures and other artifacts recovered from the former cemetery. Beginning from an opening ceremony on 7 April the same year, the route between Les Innocents and the "Clos de la Tombe-Issoire" became a nightly procession of black cloth-covered wagons carrying the millions of Parisian dead. It would take two years to empty the majority of Paris's cemeteries.

Cemeteries whose remains were moved to the Catacombs include Saints-Innocents (the largest by far with about 2 million buried over 600 years of operation), Saint-Étienne-des-Grès (one of the oldest), Madeleine Cemetery, Errancis Cemetery (used for the victims of the French Revolution), and Notre-Dame-des-Blancs-Manteaux. By this way the skeletal remains of several notable victims of the French Revolution were transferred to the Catacombs, including (the date is the date of death):

- Charlotte Corday (18 July 1793)
- 22 Girondists (31 October 1793); among them Jacques Pierre Brissot and Pierre Victurnien Vergniaud
- Louis Philippe II, Duke of Orléans (6 November 1793), father of king Louis Philippe I
- Madame Roland (8 November 1793)
- Madame du Barry (8 December 1793)
- Jacques Hébert (24 March 1794)
- Georges Jacques Danton (April 5, 1794)
- Camille Desmoulins (April 5, 1794)
- Philippe Fabre d'Églantine (April 5, 1794)
- Marie-Jean Hérault de Séchelles (April 5, 1794)
- Lucile Duplessis (April 13, 1794), widow of Camille Desmoulins
- Marie Marguerite Françoise Hébert (April 13, 1794), widow of Jacques Hébert
- Antoine-Laurent de Lavoisier (May 8, 1794)
- Madame Élisabeth (May 10, 1794), sister of kings Louis XVI, Louis XVIII and Charles X
- François Hanriot (July 28, 1794)
- Maximilien Robespierre (July 28, 1794)
- Louis Antoine de Saint-Just (July 28, 1794)
- Georges Couthon (July 28, 1794)
- Antoine Simon (July 28, 1794)

=== Renovation and ossuary decor ===
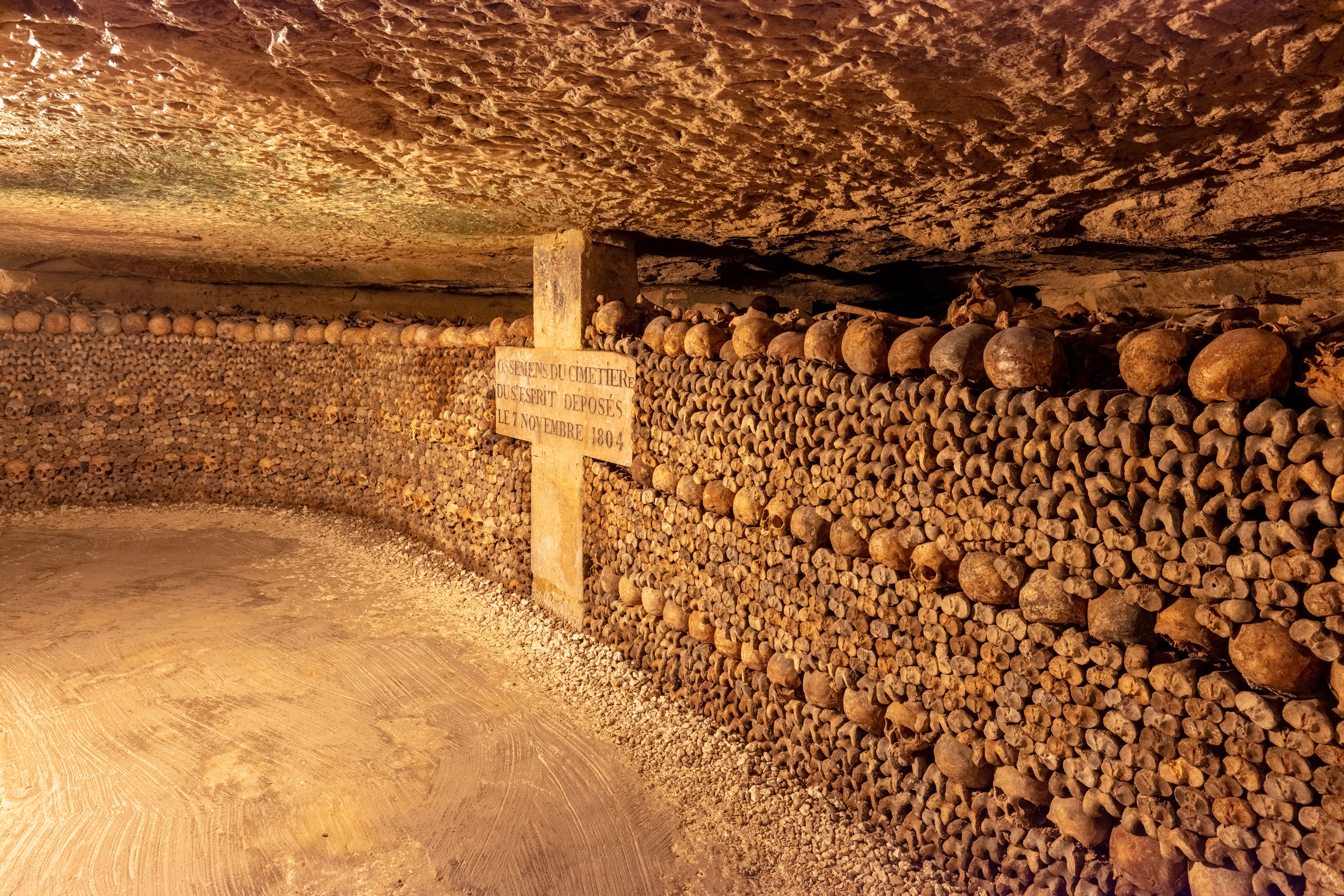
Wall made of bones

Catacombs in their first years were a disorganized bone repository, but Louis-Étienne Héricart de Thury, director of the Paris Mine Inspection Service (Inspection générale des carrières) from 1810, had renovations done that would transform the caverns into a visitable mausoleum. In addition to directing the stacking of skulls, femurs and tibias into the patterns seen in the catacombs today he used the cemetery decorations he could find (formerly stored on the Tombe-Issoire property; many had disappeared after the 1789 Revolution) to complement the walls of bones. A room dedicated to the display of the various minerals found under Paris was also created, in addition to another showing various skeletal deformities found during the catacombs' creation and renovation. He also added monumental tablets and archways bearing ominous warning inscriptions, and added stone tablets bearing descriptions or other comments about the nature of the ossuary, and to ensure the safety of eventual visitors, it was walled from the rest of Paris's Left Bank's already-extensive tunnel network.

=== Modern ===
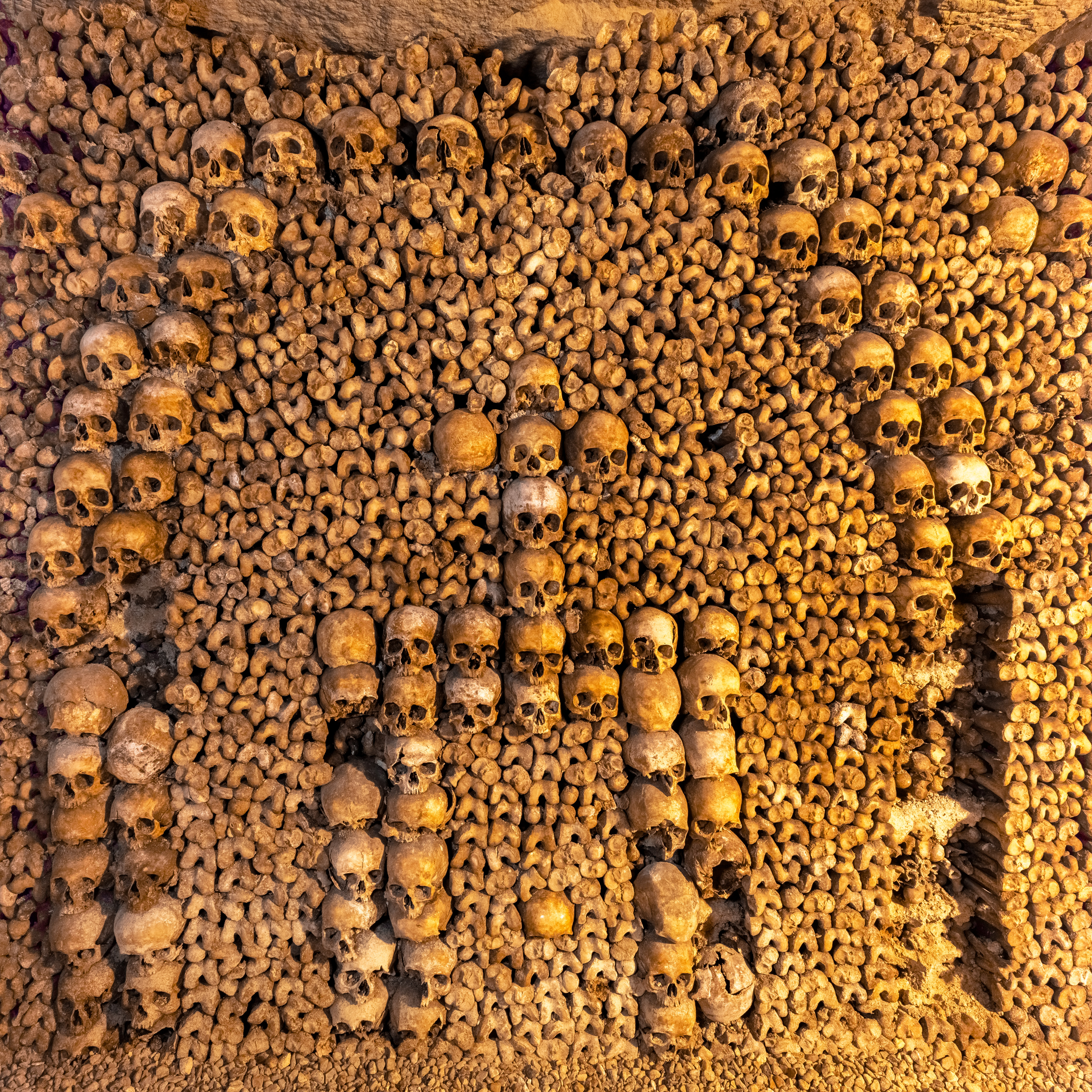
Ossuary skull and bone wall detail

During World War II, Parisian members of the French Resistance used the tunnel system and established the headquarters from where Colonel Rol-Tanguy led the insurrection for the liberation of Paris in June 1944. The Wehrmacht established an underground bunker below Lycée Montaigne, a high school in the 6th arrondissement.

In 2004, police discovered a fully equipped movie theater in an area of the catacombs underneath the Trocadéro. It was equipped with a giant cinema screen, seats for the audience, projection equipment, film reels of recent thrillers and film noir classics, a fully stocked bar, and a complete restaurant with tables and chairs. The group les UX took responsibility for the installation.

The film As Above, So Below, released in 2014, was the first production that secured permission from the French government to film in the catacombs. They aimed to use no alterations to the environment with the exception of a piano and a car which were hauled into the catacombs and set on fire.

In 2015, Airbnb paid €350,000 as part of a publicity stunt offering customers the chance to stay overnight in the Catacombs.

In August 2017, thieves broke into a cellar from the catacombs and stole more than €250,000 of wine.

In 2025, American desert rock band Queens of the Stone Age released an acoustic live performance entitled Alive in the Catacombs, recorded in 2024 while on the European leg of The End Is Nero World Tour. On the WTF with Marc Maron podcast, frontman Joshua Homme described how it took 18 years to secure permission to record in the catacombs. In 2026, architects, designers, technicians and masons undertook renovations, installing new lighting and ventilation systems, restoring the bone walls and preparing new audio guides. Some previously restricted sections were also made visible to visitors.

=== Deaths ===
Only one death has officially been confirmed in the Catacombs. In 1793, Philibert Aspairt, a door keeper for the Val-de-Grâce hospital, died in the catacombs. It is thought that he lost his light source and was left to die in the darkness. In 1804, 11 years later, his body was found, only a few meters from a staircase that led to an exit. He was only identified by his hospital key ring and the buttons on his jacket.

== Visits ==
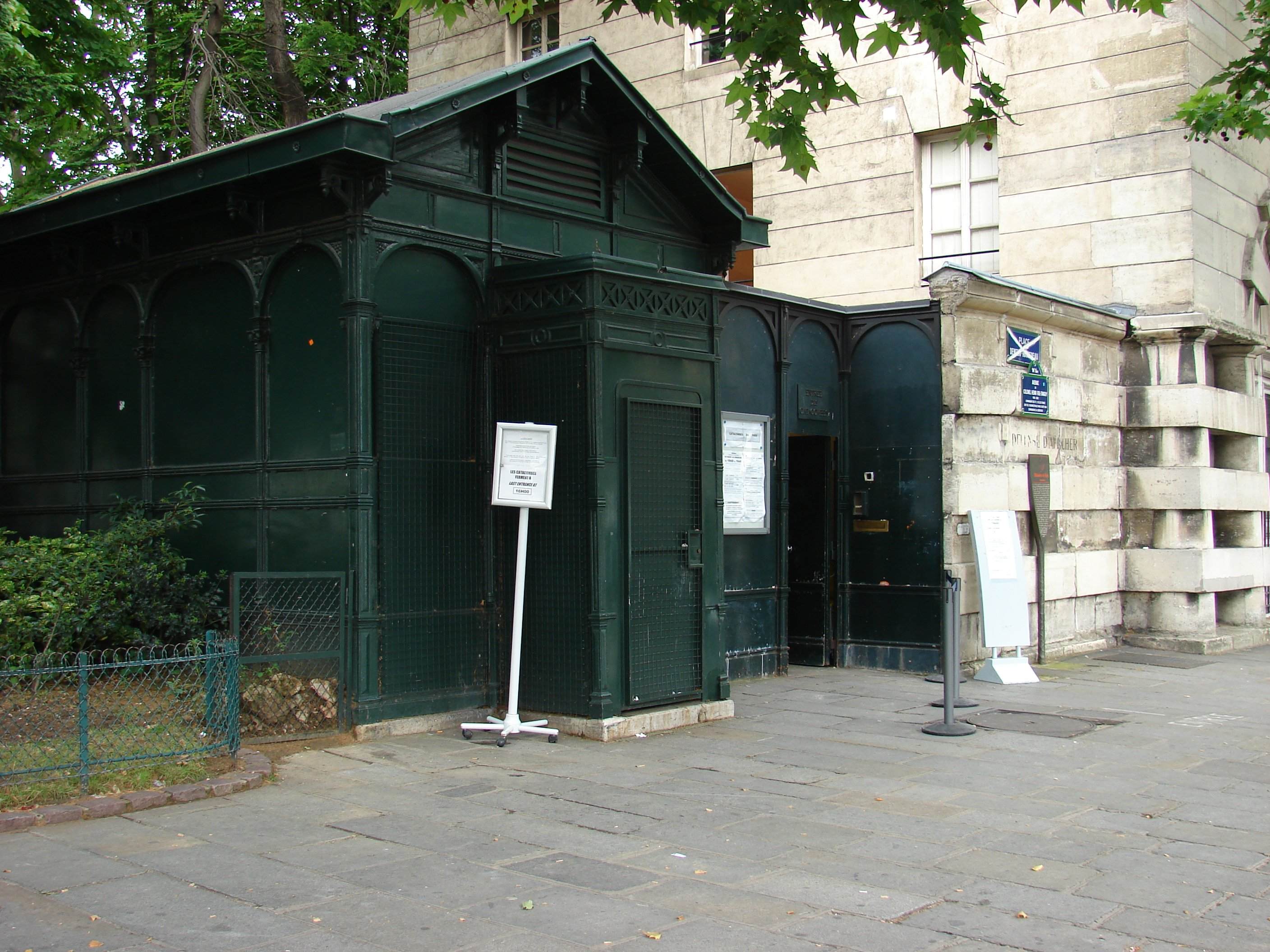
Entrance to the Catacombs

As one visits the catacombs, a sign above reads Arrête! C'est ici l'empire de la Mort ("Stop! The empire of Death lies here"). The Catacombs of Paris became a curiosity for more privileged Parisians from their creation, an early visitor being the Count of Artois (later Charles X of France) in 1787. Public visits began after its renovation into a proper ossuary and the 1814–1815 War. Initially, visitors were allowed only a few times a year with the permission of an authorized mines inspector, but later more frequently and permitted by any mine overseer. A flow of visitors degraded the ossuary to a point where the permission-only rule was restored from 1830, and the catacombs were closed completely from 1833 because of church opposition to exposing human remains to public display.

The catacombs were open again for four visits a year from 1850, and public demand caused the government to allow monthly visits from 1867, bi-weekly visits on the first and third Saturday of each month from 1874 (with an extra opening for the November 1 toussaint holiday), and weekly visits during the 1878, 1889 (the most visitors yet that year) and 1900 World's Fair Expositions. Later, they opened for regular daily visits.

After an incident of vandalism, the catacombs were closed to the public during September 2009 and reopened on 19 December of the same year.

== Disruption of surface structures ==
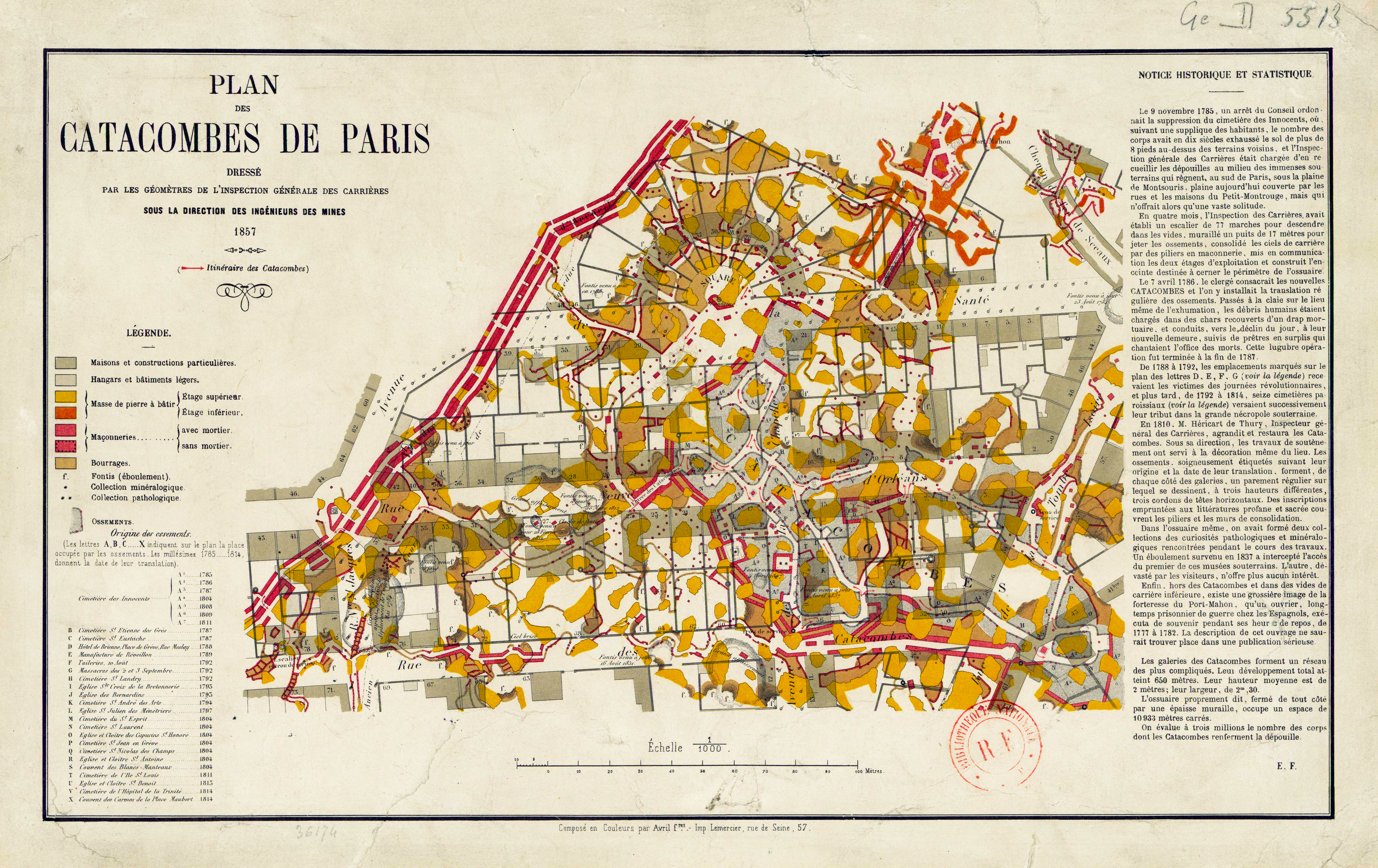
Plan of the visitable Catacombes, drawn by the IGC (Inspection Générale des Carrières) during 1858

Because the catacombs are directly under the Paris streets, large foundations cannot be built above them and cave-ins have destroyed buildings. For this reason, there are few tall buildings in this area.

== See also ==
- Odesa catacombs
- Catacombs of Rome
- Catacombs of Kom El Shofaqa
- Cataphile
