= Philibert Aspairt =

Person who died in the Catacombs of Paris (1732 – 1793)

- Born: 13 April 1732; Ravel, Puy-de-Dôme, Kingdom of France
- Disappeared: 3 November 1793 (aged 61); Catacombs of Paris, Paris, French Republic
- Status: Found 30 April 1804
- Died: Catacombs of Paris, Paris, French Republic
- Body discovered: Catacombs of Paris, Paris, French Republic
- Resting place: Catacombs of Paris, Paris, France
- Other name: Philibert Asper
- Occupations: Doorkeeper, Quarryman
- Era: French Revolution
- Employer: Val-de-Grâce

Philibert Aspairt (13 April 1732 – November 1793) was a doorkeeper of the Val-de-Grâce hospital during the French Revolution. He died in the Catacombs of Paris in November 1793 after entering them via a staircase located in the hospital courtyard. His motive was reportedly to find wine and or liquor in an underground cellar.

His body was discovered in 1804, 11 years later, in one of the quarry galleries and was buried where it was found. The cause of his death was never determined. Aspairt might have been identified by the hospital key ring hanging from his belt.

His tomb is in the restricted part of the Paris catacombs, under the rue Henri Barbusse, next to the boulevard Saint-Michel.

== Documents ==
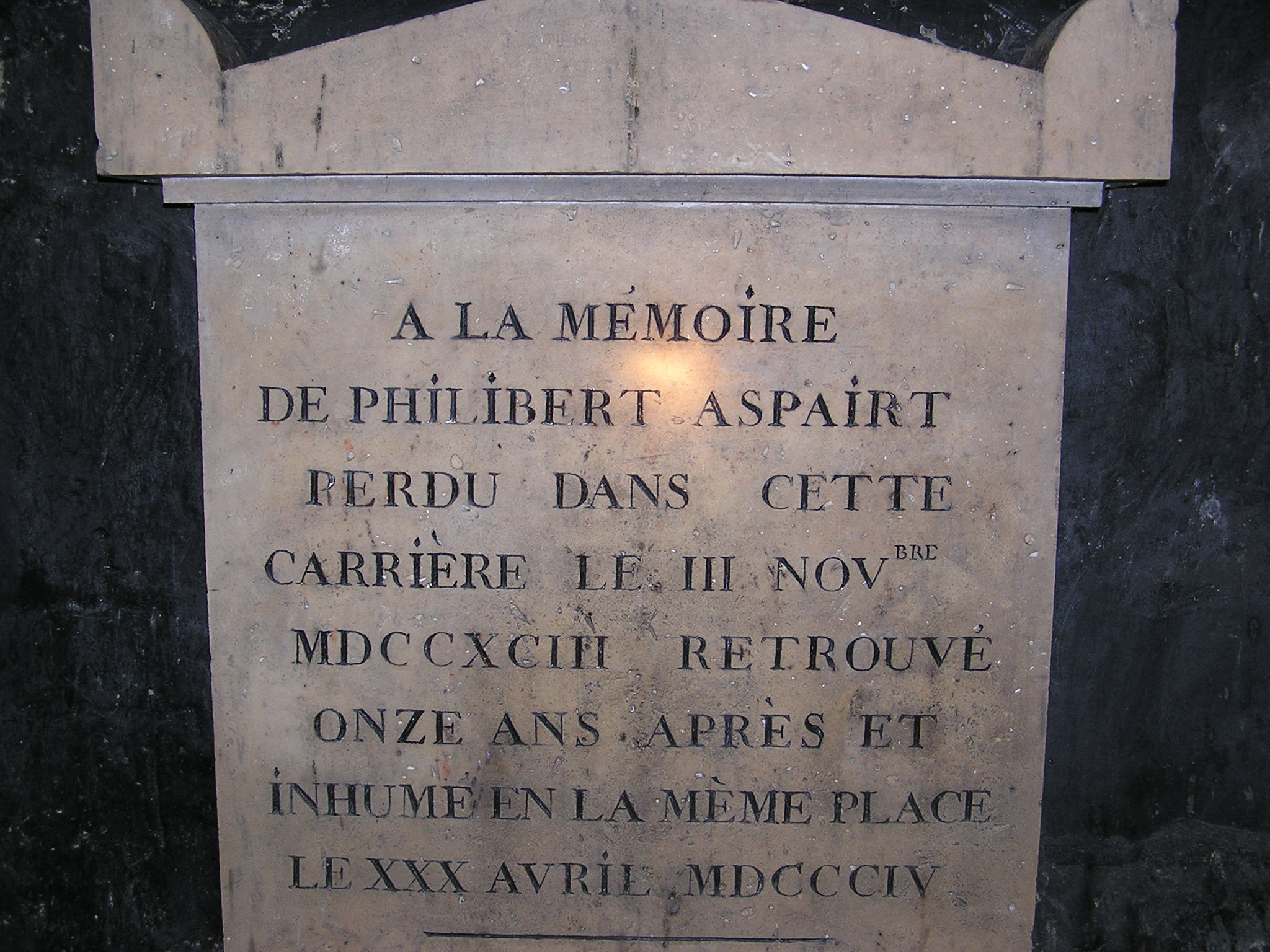
The tomb of Philibert Aspairt

His tomb bears the following inscription:

A LA MEMOIRE DE PHILIBERT ASPAIRT PERDU DANS CETTE CARRIERE LE III NOVEMBRE MDCCXCIII RETROUVE ONZE ANS APRES ET INHUME EN LA MEME PLACE LE XXX AVRIL MDCCCIV

English translation:

TO THE MEMORY OF PHILIBERT ASPAIRT, LOST IN THIS QUARRY ON 3 NOVEMBER 1793; FOUND ELEVEN YEARS LATER AND BURIED IN THE SAME PLACE ON 30 APRIL 1804.

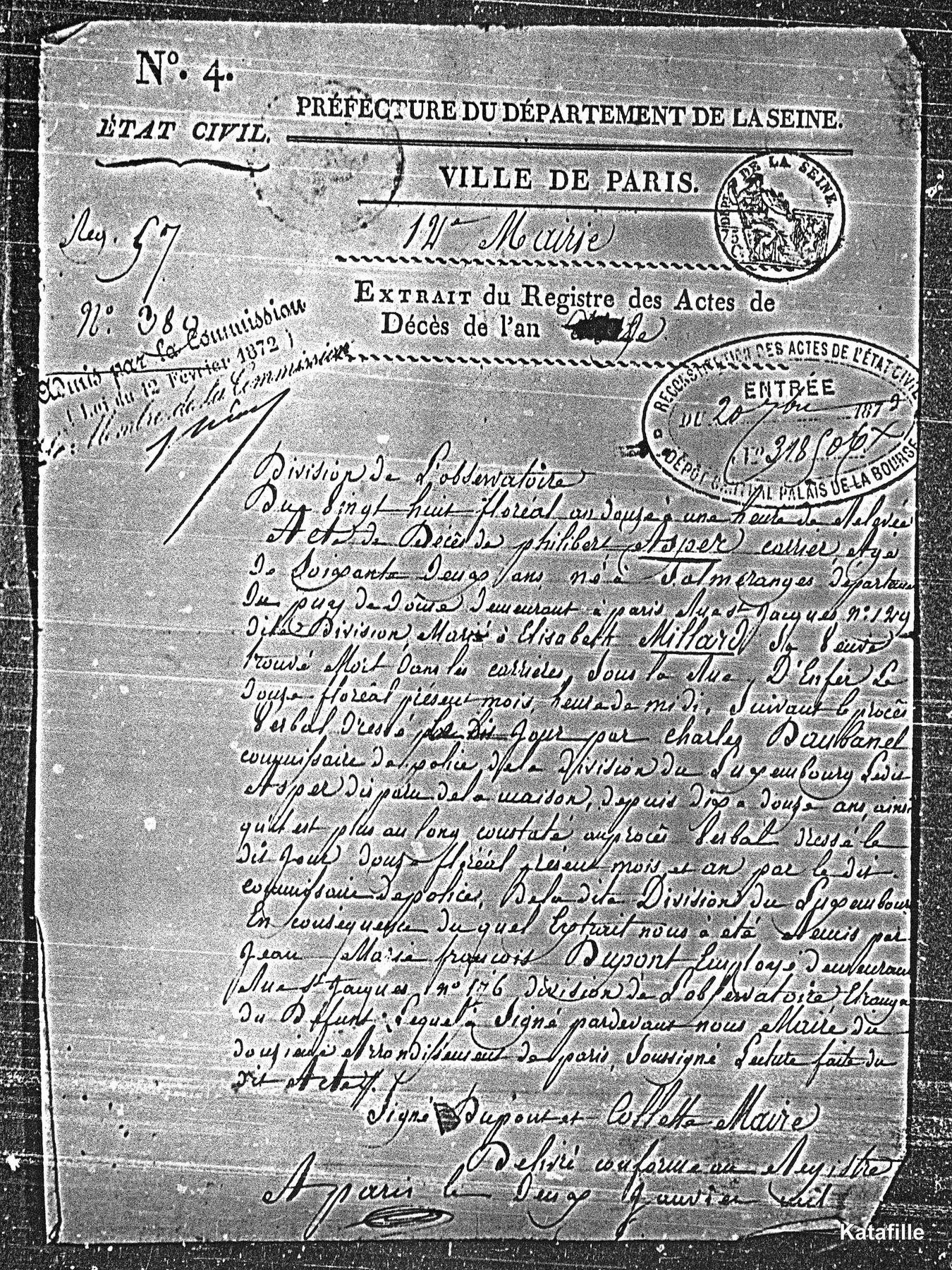
Death certificate of Philibert Asper

The archives of Ravel-Salmerange in the Puy-de-Dôme department contain the birth certificate of Philiber Asper, born on 13 April 1732. The digital archives of the city of Paris contain a death certificate for a Philibert Asper dated 2 May 1804.

Extrait du registre des Actes de Décès de l’an XXX
Division de l’observatoire
Du vingt huit floréal an douze à une heure de relevée
Acte de décès de Philibert Asper, carrier âgé de soixante deux ans, né à Salmeranges, Département du Puy de Dôme, demeurant à Paris Rue St Jacques numéro 129 dite division, marié à Elisabeth Millard sa veuve, trouvé mort dans les carrières, sous la Rue d’Enfer, le douze floréal présent mois, heure de midi, suivant le procès verbal dressé le dit jour par Charles Daubanel commissaire de police de la division du Luxembourg, Asper disparu de la maison depuis dix à douze ans ainsi qu’il est plus au long constaté au procès verbal dressé le dit jour douze floréal présent mois et an par le dit commissaire de police, de la dite division du Luxembourg En conséquence duquel extrait nous a été remis par Jean Marie François Dupont, employé demeurant Rue St Jacques 176, division de l’observatoire, étranger du défunt, lequel a signé pardevant nous Maire du douzième arrondissement de Paris, soussigné lecture faite du xx acte.
Signé Dupont et Collette Maire
Délivré conforme au registre
À Paris le deux janvier mil

English translation:

Extract of the register of death acts of year XXX

Observatoire Division
28th Floréal, year 12, 1:00
Death certificate of Philibert Asper, quarry worker, aged 62 years. Born in Salmeranges, department of Puy de Dôme, residing in Paris, Rue St Jacques 129 of said division. Married - Elisabeth Millard his widow. Found dead in the quarries under the Rue d’Enfer, on 12 Floréal of the present month, at noon. Based on the minutes written on said day by Charles Daubanel, police officer of the Luxembourg division, said Asper had been missing from his house for ten or twelve years as it is found throughout the minutes written the said day, 12 Floréal of the present month and year, by said police officer, of said Luxembourg division. In consequence of which, the extract was remitted to us by Jean Marie François Dupont, worker residing Rue St Jacques 176, Observatoire division, stranger to the deceased, who signed before us, Mayor of the Twelfth Arrondissement of Paris, undersigned reading done of XX Act.
Signed, Dupont and Collette Mayor
Issued in accordance to the register
In Paris the 2 of January

Some inconsistencies exist between different documents related to the case: a different spelling of his surname, different dates (the tomb indicates he was buried on 30 April 1804, while the death certificate is dated 8 May 1804), and his profession (Philibert was described as both a doorkeeper at the Val-de-Grâc and a quarryman).

However, it is common for the spelling of surnames to evolve over time. Differences in birth dates may be the result of mistakes in converting traditional dates to republican calendar dates. Aspairt may have been a quarryman before becoming doorkeeper at the hospital.

== See also ==
- The Necklace Affair
