= Stormwater detention vault =

Underground structure designed to manage excess stormwater runoff

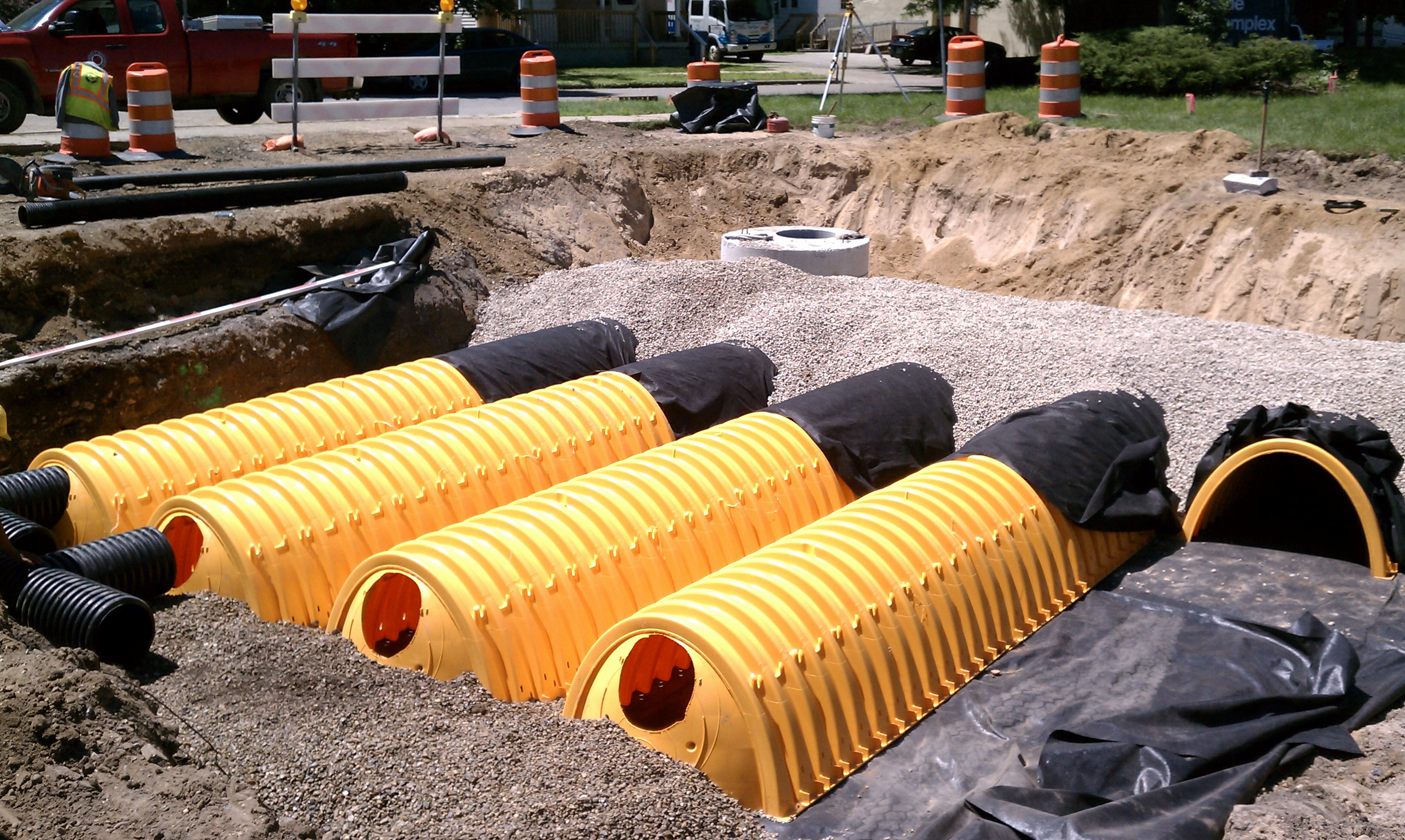
A stormwater detention system during installation beneath a parking lot in Grand Rapids, Michigan

A stormwater detention vault is an underground structure designed to manage excess stormwater runoff on a developed site, often in an urban setting. This type of best management practice may be selected when there is insufficient space on the site to infiltrate the runoff or build a surface facility such as a detention basin or retention basin.

Detention vaults manage stormwater quantity flowing to nearby surface waters. They help prevent flooding and can reduce erosion in rivers and streams. They do not provide treatment to improve water quality, though some are attached to a media filter bank to remove pollutants.

== Design and installation ==
Underground stormwater detention allows for high volume storage of runoff in a small footprint area. The storage vessels can be made from a variety of materials, including corrugated metal pipe, aluminum, steel, plastic, fiberglass, pre-cast or poured-in-place concrete.

The vault is typically buried under a parking lot or other open land on the site. In the latter case, this underground vault may be preferable to a surface detention pond if other uses are intended for the land (e.g. a pedestrian plaza or park). In other situations, a vault is used because installing a pond might pose other problems, such as attracting unwanted waterfowl or other animals. In some sites, a vault may be installed in the basement of a building, such as a parking garage. Tunnels may be bored to serve as detention vaults. Tunnels may be cheaper than basins, as they do not require pumps to move the water.

The outlet is generally a restricted-flow drain from the detention vessel, with a weir for containing detritus. Detention vessels delay water's delivery downstream, and possibly create a later water level peak post-rainfall. It is important to consider timing of water release and the types of reservoirs feeding a waterway.

== See also ==
- Best management practice for water pollution
- Detention basin
- Retention basin
- Storm drain
