= Cave Clan =

Urban exploration group

- Modern Cave Clan Logo.
- Formation: 1986
- Website: http://www.caveclan.org

The Cave Clan is a primarily Australian group dedicated to urban exploration.

== History ==
The Cave Clan was founded on 26 January (Australia Day), 1986 by three Melbourne teenagers, Woody, Dougo and Sloth. The trio had started exploring together during the summer of 1985–1986.

Originally based in Melbourne and greater Victoria, the Cave Clan expanded beyond state borders over time. The first and most notable expansion was the formation of the Sydney Cave Clan, or "Sydclan," in 1991 by Michael “Predator” Carlton. While the Melbourne and Sydney Cave Clans remain the most prominent groups, there have been Cave Clan chapters in South Australia, Queensland, the Australian Capital Territory, and Tasmania. The group has also included some international members, most notably Jeff "Ninjalicious" Chapman from Toronto, Canada.

Alfred Saddlier, a worker for the Melbourne and Metropolitan Board of Works (MMBW), is often cited as an inspiration to the Cave Clan's founders. During construction on Melbourne's drains in the 1940s and 1950s, Saddlier would leave his name and the date in tar paint before the last section of tunnel was put in place. After Saddlier was mentioned in an article in Melbourne's The Herald Sun his sister wrote to the Cave Clan explaining that her brother was in fact a "builder of drains", and not an explorer.

== Membership and activities ==
Cave Clan members explore natural or artificial tunnels and caves, along with rooftops and abandoned buildings. Their most frequent activities involve exploring underground stormwater drains, bunkers, tunnels and forts. Each chapter of the Cave Clan has its favourite locations within each city, each having a different history, with therefore different types of locations to explore. For example, in Sydney, sites the Cave Clan explore include an underground ex-naval oil reservoir in Sydney.

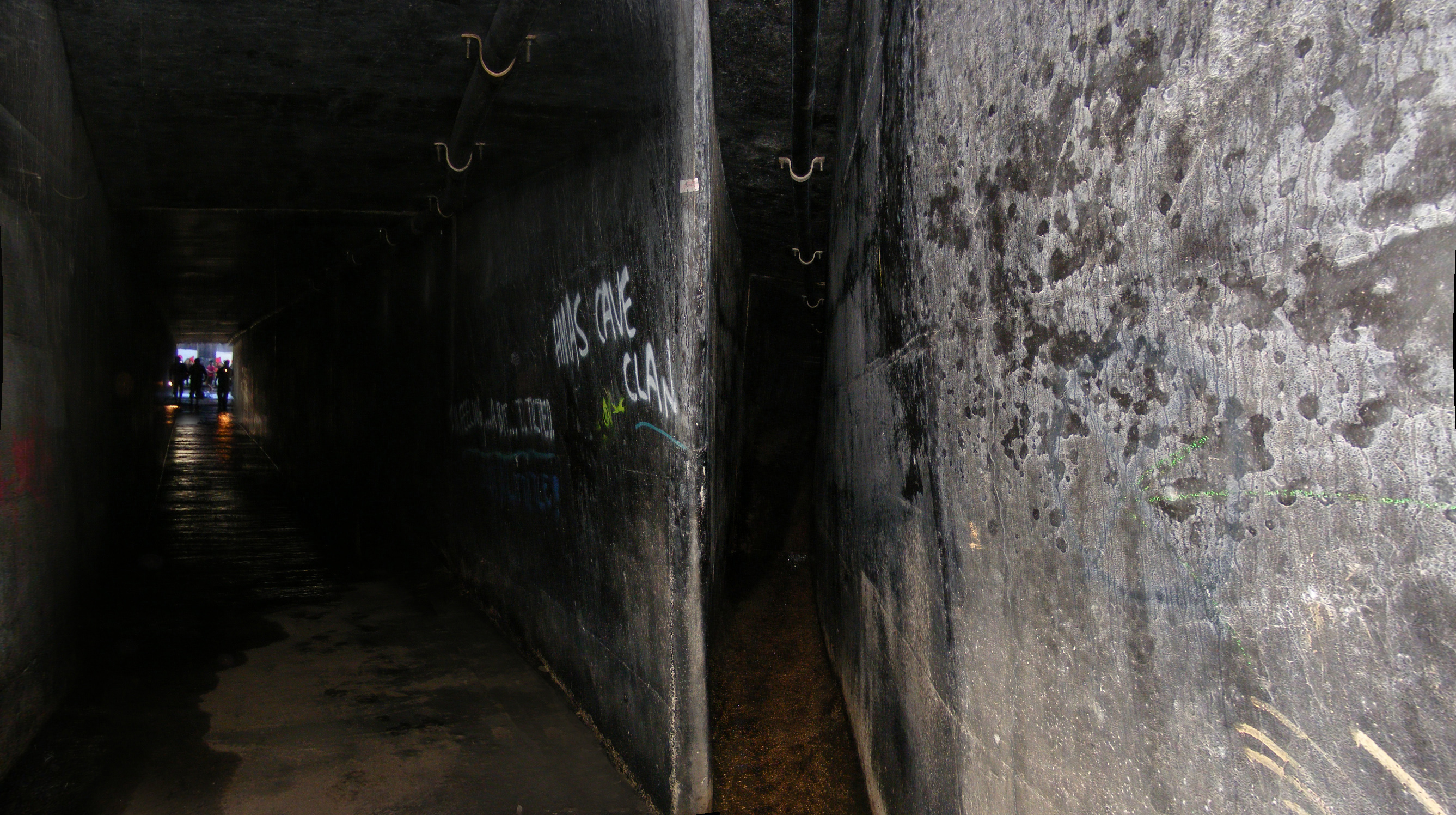
A Sydney drain with urban explorers in view.

Members of the Cave Clan come from various backgrounds including tradespersons, shop owners, teachers, government workers, writers, students, scientists, and mechanics; with the Cave Clan acting as a uniting group for people who are interested in urban exploration in Australia. Amongst other things, members are attracted by the appeal of entering locations that the public rarely sees.

== Safety issues ==
The Cave Clan does not advocate entering drains when it is raining, exploring alone, or removing a manhole from beneath if the above location is unknown. This is due to the potential hazard of the exit being on a road and thus has the risk of being struck by a vehicle. The golden rule of the Cave Clan is, "When it rains, no drains!".

== Controversy ==
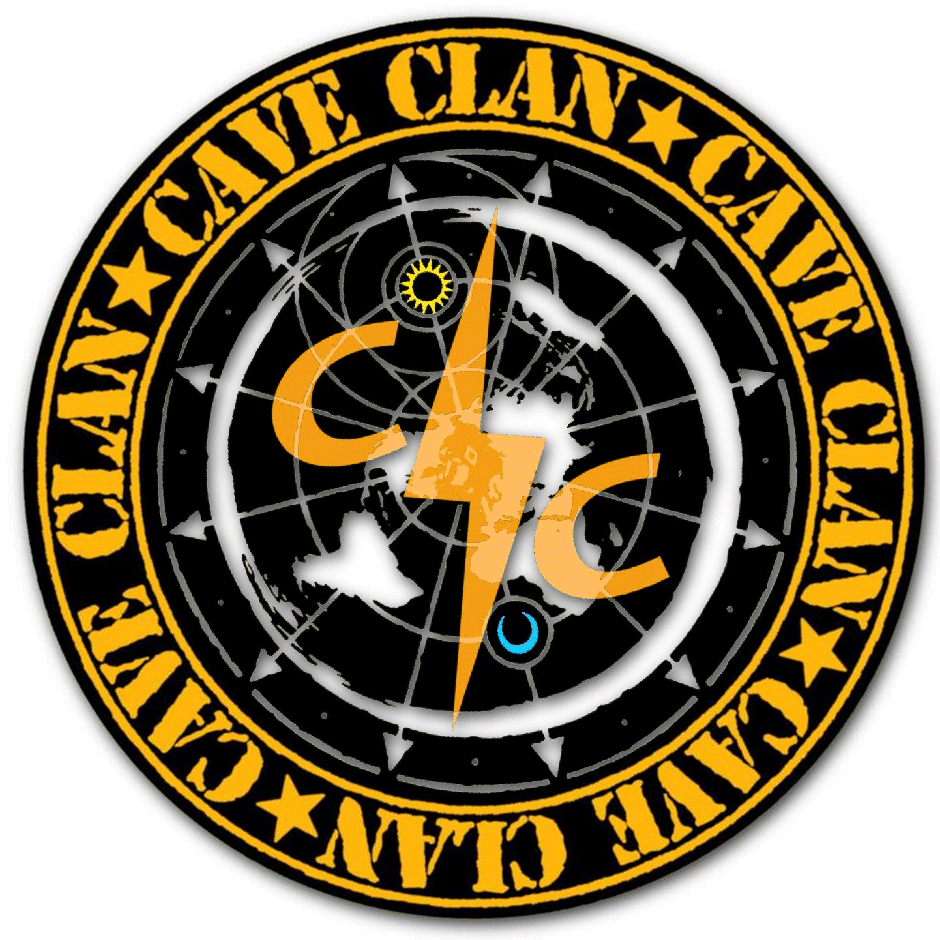
A modern compass themed Cave Clan logo.

As with urban exploration-related topics, by entering into locations or drains without permission, the members of the Cave Clan can be described as "recreational trespassers". In 2005 it was revealed that the NSW State Government had asked for the Cave Clan's help in finding tunnels that could become terrorist targets.

Coroner Hugh Dillon investigating the death of two graffiti artists in a Sydney stormwater drain in 2008 has recommended police investigate a group known as the Sydney Cave Clan. Delivering his findings into the deaths, Dillon said he was concerned about the counter-cultural message by the group, which he said consisted of "shadowy characters".

Dillon said he would recommend to police that they investigate the group and shut the website down after it was revealed that it publicised the drain and encouraged risk-taking activity. Malinowsky, the sole survivor of the trio, alleged at the inquest that he was encouraged by a website from the so-called "Cave Clan"—a group which he alleged dared people to explore urban underground spaces.

== Graffiti ==
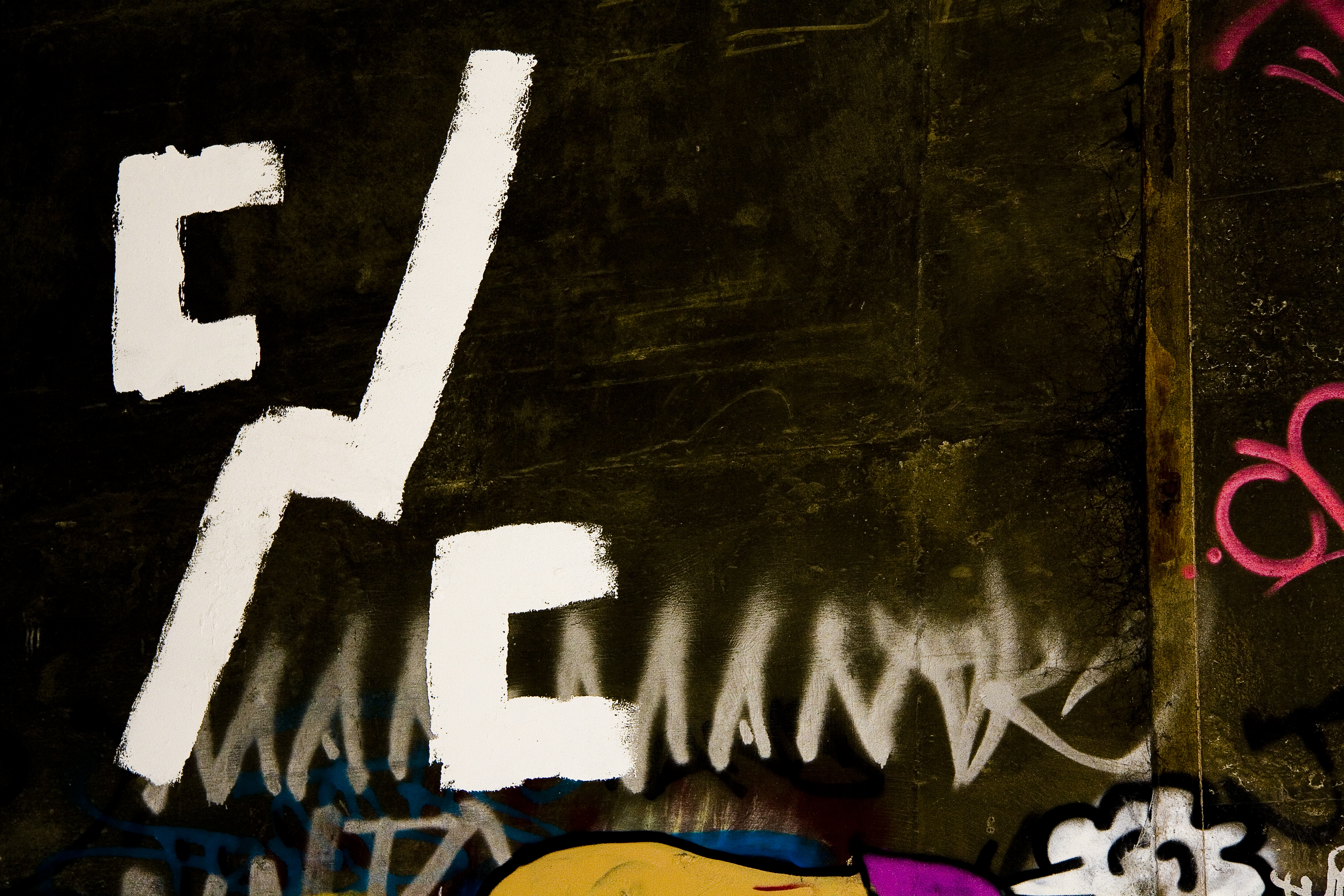
A cave clan tag left underground in the Hobart Rivulet

The Cave Clan has long officially distanced itself from graffiti, despite the historical practice of discreet tagging as a historical documentation practice. Drain tagging is discouraged, especially in historically significant areas; there are clear examples, however, of the Cave Clan name, logo and other specific material related to the Cave Clan and/or their members, being used in graffiti, by unknown sources. The group accepts leaving details of an expedition in a plain section of the drain, tunnel or cavity to mark the place and time, and placing stickers above ground for promotional purposes.

== Related groups ==
Several groups have been historically significant to or influenced by the Cave Clan. One of the earliest known groups is the "Drainiacs," active during the 1960s. Information about the Drainiacs is scarce, with their existence documented solely through house paint inscriptions of their groups name and dates on tunnel walls.

In the mid-to-late 1980s, coinciding with the Cave Clan's formation, smaller groups such as the Drain Dwellers and Tunnel Team operated in the same space. These groups were eventually absorbed into the Cave Clan, contributing to its early development.

In subsequent years, the Cave Clan has inspired the formation of other groups, including the Darksiders in South Australia and the Tunnel Toads in Victoria. These groups reflect the enduring influence of the Cave Clan on urban exploration culture.

== Cultural references ==
"Cave Clan" is the subject and title of a song released on the Mick Thomas album Spin! Spin! Spin!.
"Cave Clan" is also a song by Neatly Folded Goat
In 2016, Australian record label Superconscious Records released "Cave Clan" by Melbourne producer Bjorn This Way. The song was a nostalgic tribute to the producer's experiences exploring drains and tunnels in the south eastern suburbs of Melbourne as a teenager.

== See also ==
- Mouse-holing
- Roof and tunnel hacking
- Urban exploration
- Wayfinding
