= Storm drain =

Infrastructure for draining excess rain and ground water from impervious surfaces

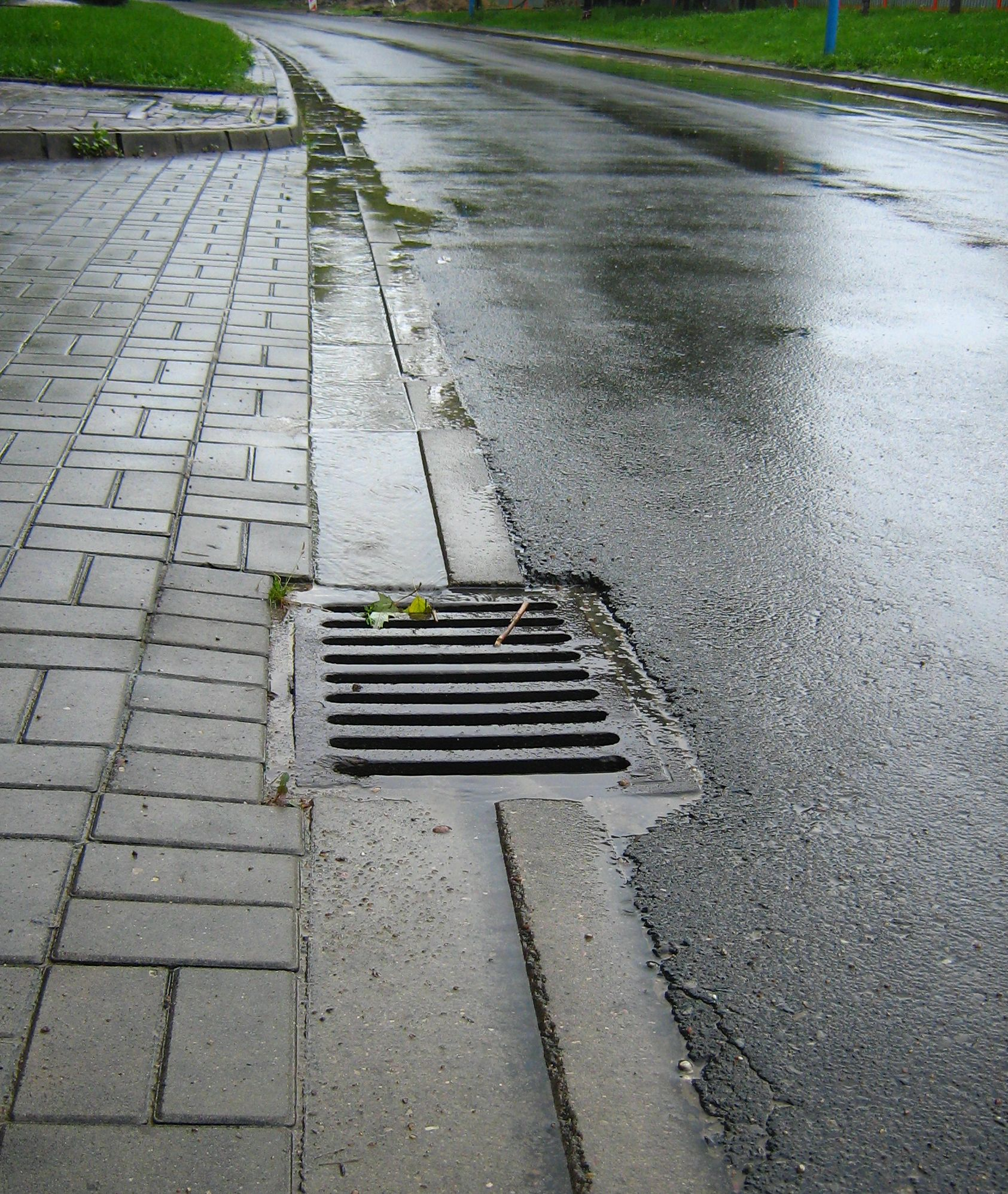
Storm drain grate on a street in Warsaw, Poland

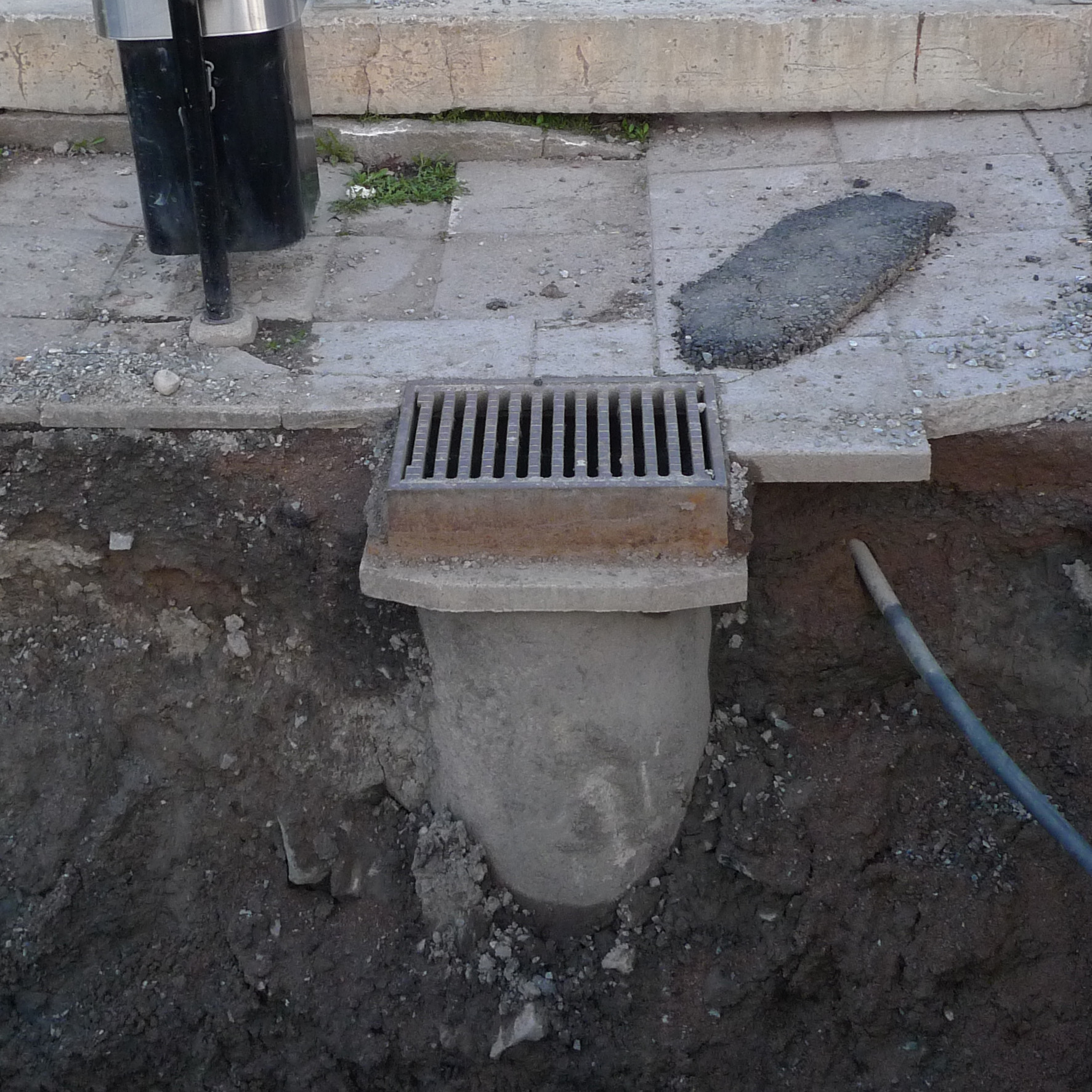
Storm drain with its pipe visible beneath it due to construction work

A storm drain, storm sewer (United Kingdom, U.S. and Canada), highway drain, surface water drain/sewer (United Kingdom), or stormwater drain (Australia and New Zealand) is infrastructure designed to drain excess rain and ground water from impervious surfaces such as paved streets, car parks, parking lots, footpaths, sidewalks, and roofs. Storm drains vary in design from small residential dry wells to large municipal systems.

Drains receive water from street gutters on most motorways, freeways and other busy roads, as well as towns in areas with heavy rainfall that leads to flooding, and coastal towns with regular storms. Even rain gutters from houses and buildings can connect to the storm drain. Since many storm drainage systems are gravity sewers that drain untreated storm water into rivers or streams, any hazardous substances poured into the drains will contaminate the destination bodies of water.

Storm drains sometimes cannot manage the quantity of rain that falls in heavy rains or storms. Inundated drains can cause basement and street flooding. Many areas require detention tanks inside a property that temporarily hold runoff in heavy rains and restrict outlet flow to the public sewer. This reduces the risk of overwhelming the public sewer. Some storm drains mix stormwater (rainwater) with sewage, either intentionally in the case of combined sewers, or unintentionally.

== Nomenclature ==
Several related terms are used differently in American and British English.

Term	American	British	Comments
Combined sewer	A sewer designed and intended to serve as a sanitary sewer and a storm sewer, or as an industrial sewer and a storm sewer	Same as American English	Stormwater mixed with sewage
Storm sewer, Surface water sewer, or surface sewer	A sewer designed and intended to carry only stormwater, surface runoff, street wash waters, and drainage	A sewer designed and intended to carry only rainwater runoff	Only stormwater
Stormwater bypass	Same as British English	A combined sewer discharge pipeline intended to bypass wastewater treatment plants during peak runoff events	Stormwater mixed with sewage
Road channel	See roadside ditch	A roadside channel to prevent uncontrolled runoff along roadway surfaces	Only stormwater
Road gully	See roadside ditch	Consists of a gully grating on a chamber that connects to a surface water sewer / drain, ditch, or watercourse	Only stormwater
Roadside ditch	A roadside channel to prevent uncontrolled runoff along roadway surfaces	See road gully	Only stormwater

== Function ==
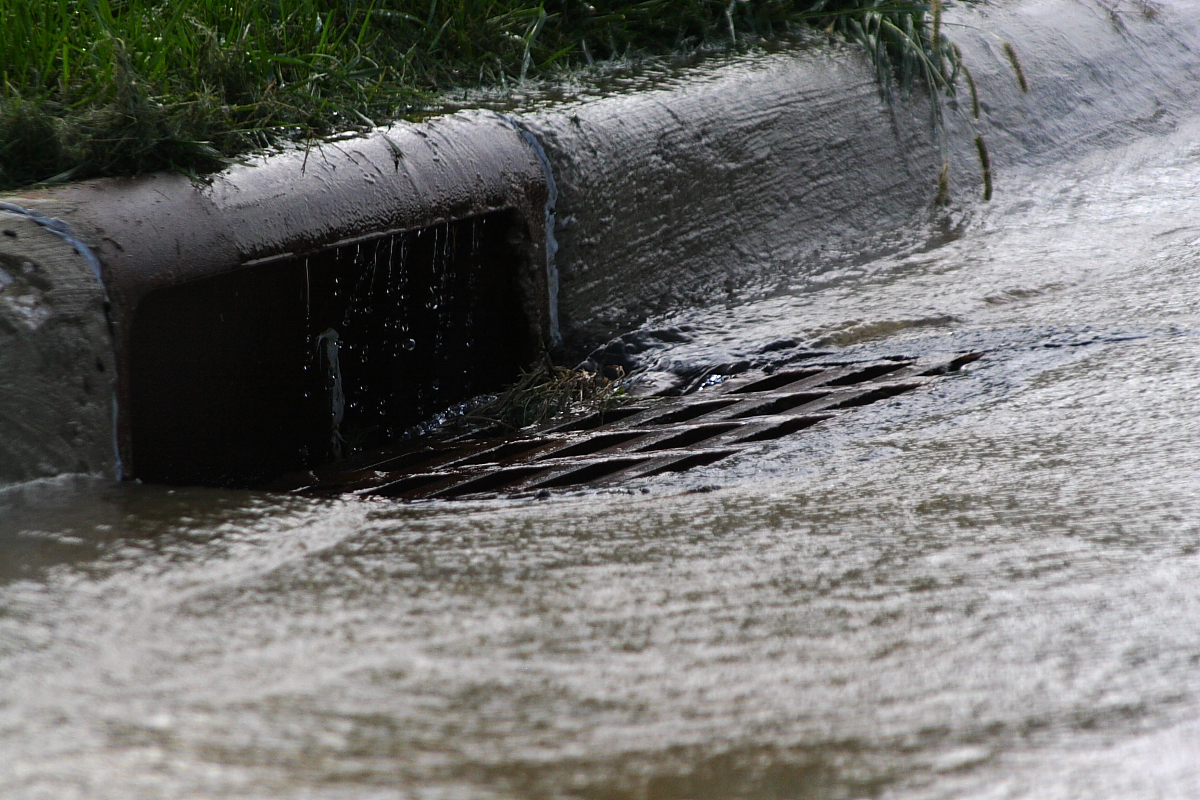
American-style curbside storm drain receiving urban runoff

=== Inlet ===
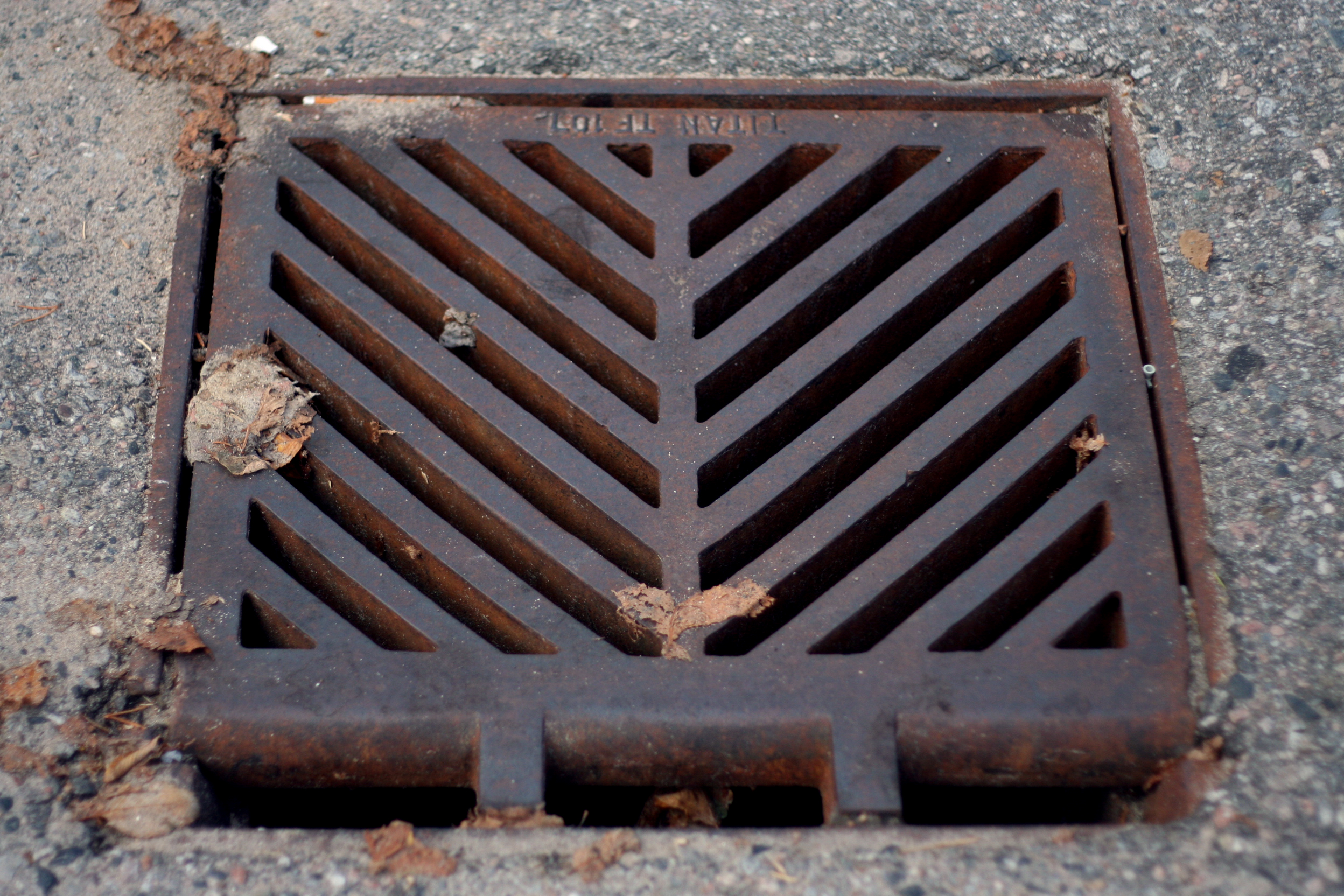
Full view of a storm drain (Ontario, Canada)

There are two main types of stormwater drain (highway drain or road gully in the UK) inlets: side inlets and grated inlets. Side inlets are located adjacent to the curb and rely on the ability of the opening under the back stone or lintel to capture flow. They are usually depressed at the invert of the channel to improve capture capacity.

Many inlets have gratings or grids to prevent people, vehicles, large objects or debris from falling into the storm drain. Grate bars are spaced so that the flow of water is not impeded, but sediment and many small objects can also fall through. However, if grate bars are too far apart, the openings may present a risk to pedestrians, bicyclists, and others in the vicinity. Grates with long narrow slots parallel to traffic flow are of particular concern to cyclists, as the front tire of a bicycle may become stuck, causing the cyclist to go over the handlebars or lose control and fall. Storm drains in streets and parking areas must be strong enough to support the weight of vehicles, and are often made of cast iron or reinforced concrete.

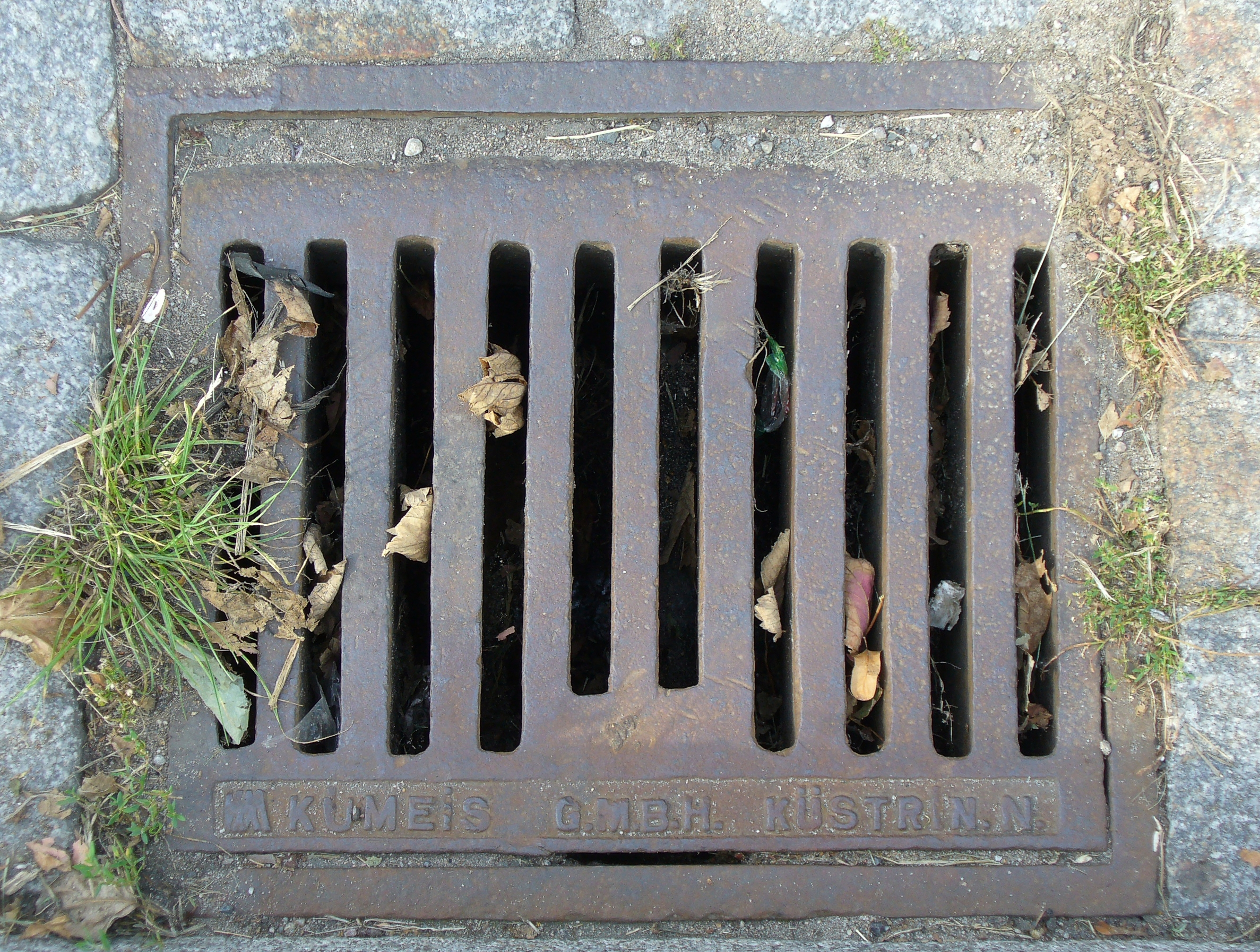
Storm drain in Kostrzyn nad Odrą in Poland (formerly Küstrin)

Some of the heavier sediment and small objects may settle in a catch basin, or sump, which lies immediately below the outlet, where water from the top of the catch basin reservoir overflows into the sewer proper. The catchbasin serves much the same function as the "trap" in household wastewater plumbing in trapping objects.

In the United States, unlike the plumbing trap, the catch basin does not necessarily prevent sewer gases such as hydrogen sulfide and methane from escaping. However, in the United Kingdom, where they are called gully pots, they are designed as true water-filled traps and do block the egress of gases and rodents.

Most catchbasins contain stagnant water during drier parts of the year and can, in warm countries, become mosquito breeding grounds. Larvicides or disruptive larval hormones, sometimes released from "mosquito biscuits", have been used to control mosquito breeding in catch basins. Mosquitoes may be physically prevented from reaching the standing water or migrating into the sewer proper by the use of an "inverted cone filter". Another method of mosquito control is to spread a thin layer of oil on the surface of stagnant water, interfering with the breathing tubes of mosquito larvae.

The performance of catch basins at removing sediment and other pollutants depends on the design of the catchbasin (for example, the size of the sump), and on routine maintenance to retain the storage available in the sump to capture sediment. Municipalities typically have large vacuum trucks that perform this task.

Catch basins act as the first-line pretreatment for other treatment practices, such as retention basins, by capturing large sediments and street litter from urban runoff before it enters the storm drainage pipes.

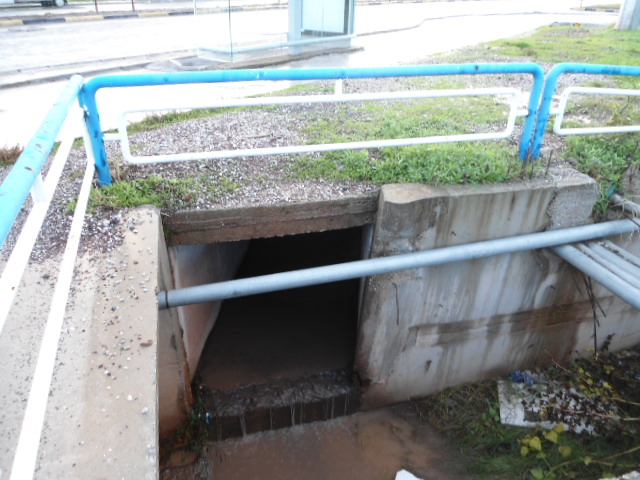
A storm drain culvert under the main road empties into a bigger open channel

=== Piping ===
Pipes can come in many different cross-sectional shapes (rectangular, square, bread-loaf-shaped, oval, inverted pear-shaped, egg shaped, and most commonly, circular). Drainage systems may have many different features including waterfalls, stairways, balconies and pits for catching rubbish, sometimes called Gross Pollutant Traps (GPTs). Pipes made of different materials can also be used, such as brick, concrete, high-density polyethylene or galvanized steel. Fibre reinforced plastic is being used more commonly for drain pipes and fittings.

=== Outlet ===
Most drains have a single large exit at their point of discharge (often covered by a grating) into a canal, river, lake, reservoir, sea or ocean. Other than catchbasins, typically there are no treatment facilities in the piping system. Small storm drains may discharge into individual dry wells. Storm drains may be interconnected using slotted pipe, to make a larger dry well system. Storm drains may discharge into human-made excavations known as recharge basins or retention ponds.

== Current practices ==
Simple infrastructure such as open drains, pipes, and berms are still common. In modern times, more complex structures involving substantial earthworks and new technologies are common as well.

=== 21st century alternatives ===
Seattle's Public Utilities created a pilot program called Street Edge Alternatives Project. The project focuses on designing a system "to provide drainage that more closely mimics the natural landscape prior to development than traditional piped systems". The streets are characterized by ditches along the side of the roadway, with plantings designed throughout the area. An emphasis on non-curbed sidewalks allows water to flow more freely into the areas of permeable surface on the side of the streets. Because of the plantings, the run off water from the urban area does not all directly go into the ground, but can also be absorbed into the surrounding environment. Monitoring conducted by Seattle Public Utilities reports a 99 percent reduction of storm water leaving the drainage project.

Drainage has undergone a large-scale environmental review in the recent past in the United Kingdom. Sustainable urban drainage systems (SUDS) are designed to encourage contractors to install drainage system that more closely mimic the natural flow of water in nature. Since 2010 local and neighbourhood planning in the UK is required by law to factor SUDS into any development projects that they are responsible for.

Slot drainage is a channel drainage system designed to eliminate the need for further pipework systems to be installed in parallel to the drainage, reducing the environmental impact of production as well as improving water collection. Stainless steel, concrete channel, PVC and HDPE are all materials available for slot drainage which have become industry standards on construction projects.

== Environmental impacts ==
=== Water quantity ===
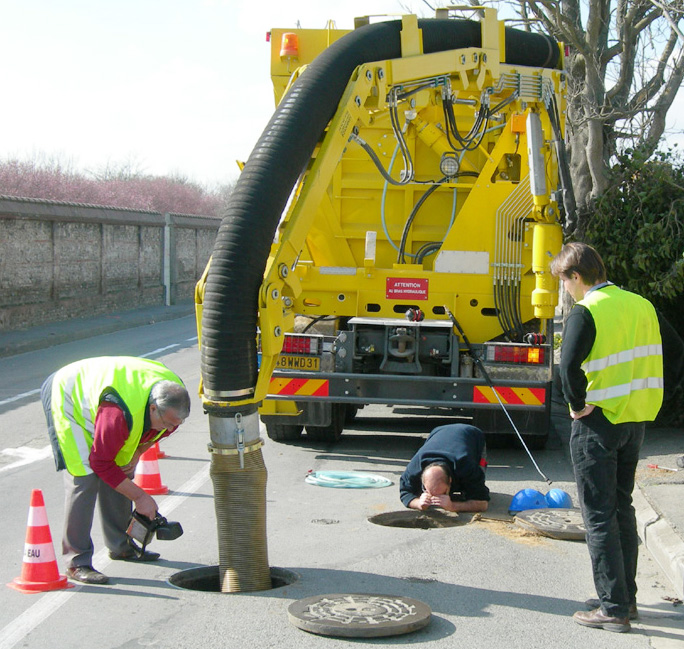
A truck for cleaning storm drains

Storm drains are often unable to manage the quantity of rain that falls during heavy rains and/or storms. When storm drains are inundated, basement and street flooding can occur. Unlike catastrophic flooding events, this type of urban flooding occurs in built-up areas where human-made drainage systems are prevalent. Urban flooding is the primary cause of sewer backups and basement flooding, which can affect properties repeatedly.

Clogged drains also contribute to flooding by the obstruction of storm drains. Communities or cities can help reduce this by cleaning leaves from the storm drains to stop ponding or flooding into yards. Snow in the winter can also clog drains when there is an unusual amount of rain in the winter and snow is plowed atop storm drains.

Runoff into storm sewers can be minimized by including sustainable urban drainage systems (UK term) or low impact development or green infrastructure practices (US terms) into municipal plans. To reduce stormwater from rooftops, flows from eaves troughs (rain gutters and downspouts) may be infiltrated into adjacent soil, rather than discharged into the storm sewer system. Storm water runoff from paved surfaces can be directed to unlined ditches (sometimes called swales or bioswales) before flowing into the storm sewers, again to allow the runoff to soak into the ground. Permeable paving materials can be used in building sidewalks, driveways and in some cases, parking lots, to infiltrate a portion of the stormwater volume.

Many areas require that properties have detention tanks that temporarily hold rainwater runoff, and restrict the outlet flow to the public sewer. This lessens the risk of overburdening the public sewer during heavy rain. An overflow outlet may also connect higher on the outlet side of the detention tank. This overflow prevents the detention tank from completely filling. Restricting water flow and temporarily holding the water in a detention tank public this way makes it far less likely for rain to overwhelm the sewers.

=== Water quality ===
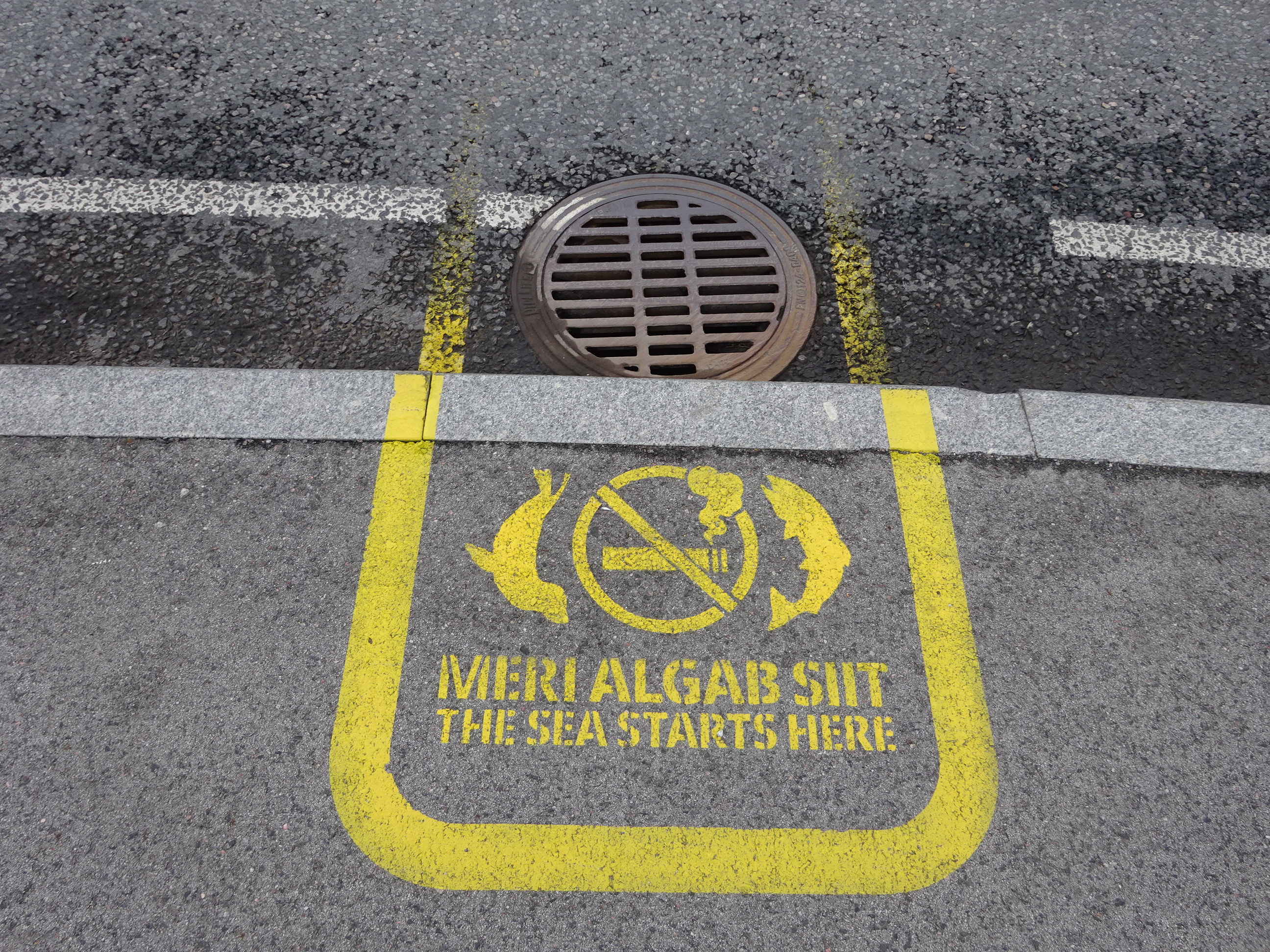
Drain cover, located in Tallinn, Estonia, with a mention of the sewer's proximity to the sea

The first flush from urban runoff can be extremely dirty. Storm water may become contaminated while running down the road or other impervious surface, or from lawn chemical run-off, before entering the drain.

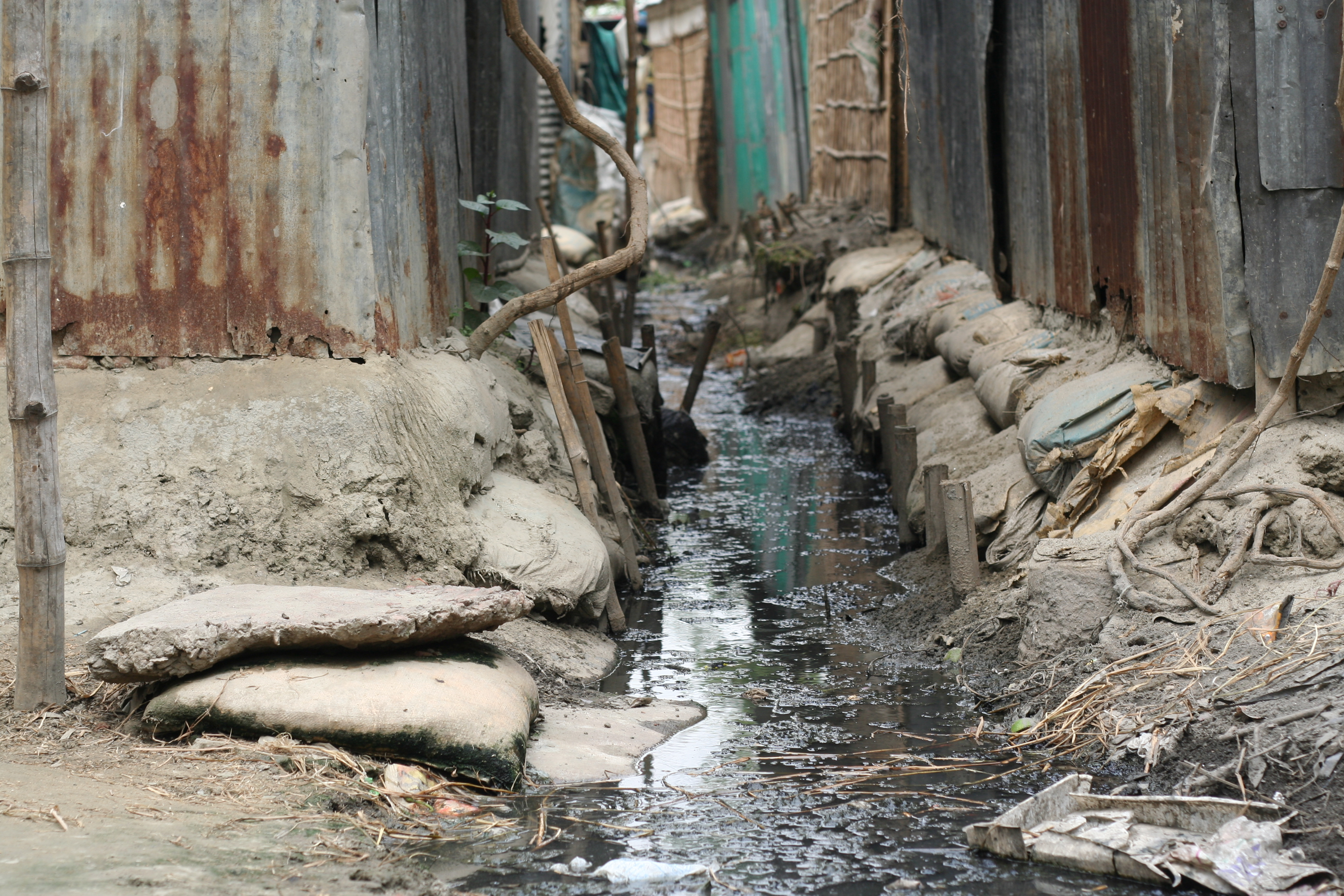
Lack of proper storm drains and sewer systems in Kalibari community in Mymensingh, Bangladesh – a common situation in urban slums in developing countries

Water running off these impervious surfaces tends to pick up gasoline, motor oil, heavy metals, trash and other pollutants from roadways and parking lots, as well as fertilizers and pesticides from lawns. Roads and parking lots are major sources of nickel, copper, zinc, cadmium, lead and polycyclic aromatic hydrocarbons (PAHs), which are created as combustion byproducts of gasoline and other fossil fuels. Roof runoff contributes high levels of synthetic organic compounds and zinc (from galvanized gutters). Fertilizer use on residential lawns, parks and golf courses is a significant source of nitrates and phosphorus.

Separation of undesired runoff can be achieved by installing devices within the storm sewer system. These devices are relatively new and can only be installed with new development or during major upgrades. They are referred to as oil-grit separators (OGS) or oil-sediment separators (OSS). They consist of a specialized manhole chamber, and use the water flow and/or gravity to separate oil and grit.

=== Mosquito breeding ===
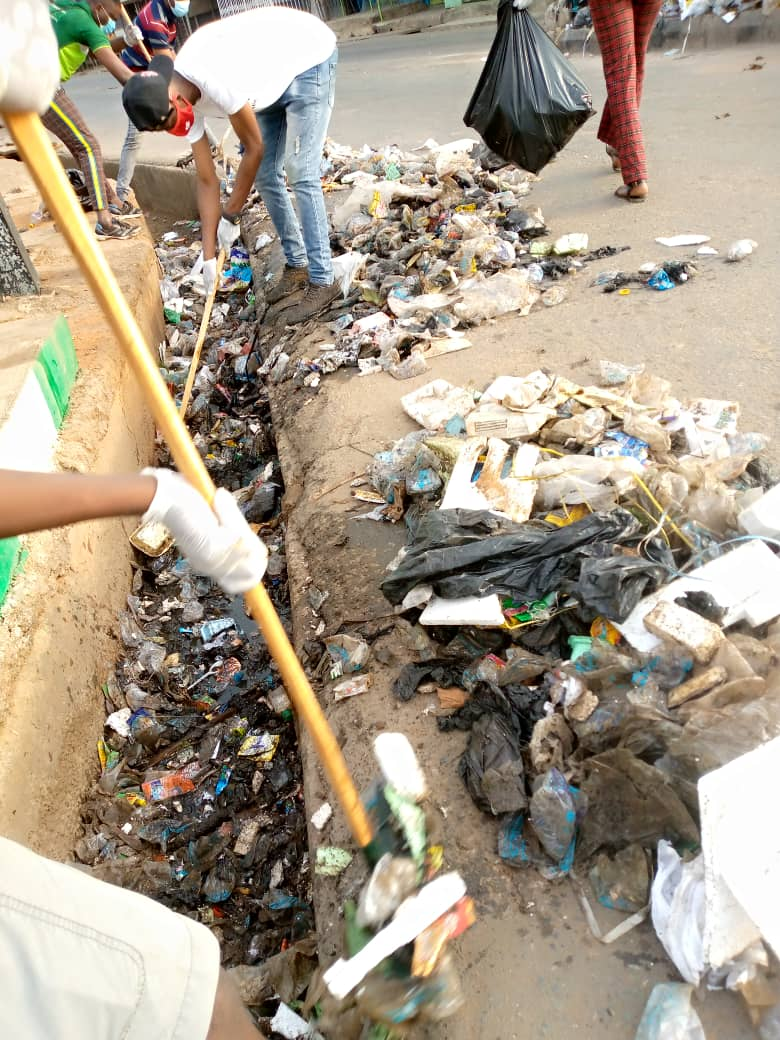
Volunteers clearing gutters in Ilorin, Nigeria, during a volunteer sanitation day. Even when there is adequate infrastructure for sanitation, plastic pollution can interfere with stormwater runoff creating space for mosquitos to breed in water, and causing flooding. Some sewage systems in the Global South are frequently overwhelmed by the waste, such as in Bangkok, Thailand.

Catch basins are commonly designed with a sump area below the outlet pipe level—a reservoir for water and debris that helps prevent the pipe from clogging. Unless constructed with permeable bottoms to let water infiltrate into underlying soil, this subterranean basin can become a mosquito breeding area, because it is cool, dark, and retains stagnant water for a long time. Combined with standard grates, which have holes large enough for mosquitoes to enter and leave the basin, this is a major problem in mosquito control.

Basins can be filled with concrete up to the pipe level to prevent this reservoir from forming. Without proper maintenance, the functionality of the basin is questionable, as these catch basins are most commonly not cleaned annually as is needed to make them perform as designed. The trapping of debris serves no purpose because once filled they operate as if no basins were present, but continue to allow a shallow area of water retention for the breeding of mosquito. Moreover, even if cleaned and maintained, the water reservoir remains filled, accommodating the breeding of mosquitoes.

== Relationship to sanitary sewer systems ==
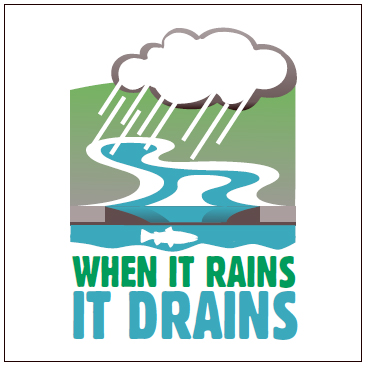
Sign alerting public to avoid dumping waste into storm drains

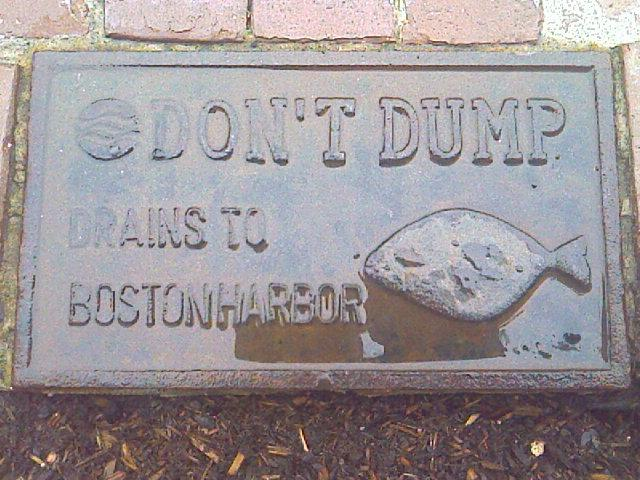
Typical signage embedded in pavement next to a storm drain in Boston, in the United States

Storm drains are separate and distinct from sanitary sewer systems. The separation of storm sewers from sanitary sewers helps prevent sewage treatment plants becoming overwhelmed by infiltration/inflow during a rainstorm, which could discharge untreated sewage into the environment.

Many storm drainage systems drain untreated storm water into rivers or streams. In the US, many local governments conduct public awareness campaigns about this, lest people dump waste into the storm drain system. In Cleveland, Ohio, for example, all new catch basins installed have inscriptions on them not to dump any waste, and usually include a fish imprint as well. Trout Unlimited Canada recommends that a yellow fish symbol be painted next to existing storm drains.

=== Combined sewers ===
Cities that installed their sewage collection systems before the 1930s typically used single piping systems to transport both urban runoff and sewage. This type of collection system is referred to as a combined sewer system (CSS). The cities' rationale when combined sewers were built was that it would be cheaper to build just a single system. In these systems a sudden large rainfall that exceeds sewage treatment capacity is allowed to overflow directly from storm drains into receiving waters via structures called combined sewer overflows.

Storm drains are typically installed at shallower depths than combined sewers. This is because combined sewers were designed to accept sewage flows from buildings with basements, in addition to receiving surface runoff from streets.

About 860 communities in the US have combined sewer systems, serving about 40 million people. New York City, Washington, D.C., Seattle and other cities with combined systems have this problem due to a large influx of storm water after every heavy rain event. Some cities have dealt with this by adding large storage tanks or ponds to hold the water until it can be treated. Chicago has a system of tunnels, collectively called the Deep Tunnel, underneath the city for storing its stormwater. Many areas require detention tanks or roof detention systems that temporarily hold runoff in heavy rains and restrict outlet flow to the public sewer. This lessens the risk of overwhelming the public sewer in heavy rain. An overflow outlet may also connect higher on the outlet side of the detention tank. This overflow prevents the detention tank from completely filling. By restricting the flow of water in this way and temporarily holding the water in a detention vault or tank or by rooftop detention, public sewers are less likely to overflow.

== Regulations and local building codes ==
Building codes and local government ordinances vary significantly on the handling of storm drain runoff. New developments might be required to construct their storm drain processing capacity for returning the runoff to the water table and bioswales may be required in sensitive ecological areas to protect the watershed.

In the United States, cities, suburban communities, and towns with over 100,000 population, smaller community drainage systems in urbanized areas, and additional municipal systems that are specifically designated by state agencies are required to obtain discharge permits for their storm sewer systems under the Clean Water Act. The Environmental Protection Agency (EPA) issued stormwater regulations for large cities in 1990 and for other communities in 1999. The permits require local governments to operate stormwater management programs, covering both construction of new buildings and facilities, and maintenance of their existing municipal drainage networks. For new construction projects, many municipalities require builders to obtain approval of the site drainage system and structural plans. State government facilities, such as roads and highways, are also subject to the stormwater management regulations.

=== Examples ===
Southeastern Los Angeles County installed thousands of stainless steel, full-capture trash devices on their road drains in 2011.

== Exploration ==
An international subculture has grown up around exploring stormwater drains. Societies such as the Cave Clan regularly explore the drains underneath cities. This is commonly known as "urban exploration", but is also known as draining when in specific relation to storm drains.

== Residence ==
In several large American cities, homeless people live in storm drains. At least 300 people live in the 200 miles of underground storm drains of Las Vegas, many of them making a living finding unclaimed winnings in the gambling machines. An organization called Shine a Light was founded in 2009 to help the drain residents after over 20 drowning deaths occurred in the preceding years. A man in San Diego was evicted from a storm drain after living there for nine months in 1986.

== History ==
Archaeological studies have revealed use of rather sophisticated stormwater runoff systems in ancient cultures. For example, in Minoan Crete around 2000 BC, cities such as Phaistos were designed to have storm drains and channels to collect precipitation runoff. At Cretan Knossos, storm drains include stone-lined structures large enough for a person to crawl through. Other examples of early civilizations with elements of stormwater drain systems include early people of Mainland Orkney such as Gurness and the Brough of Birsay in Scotland.

=== Early history ===
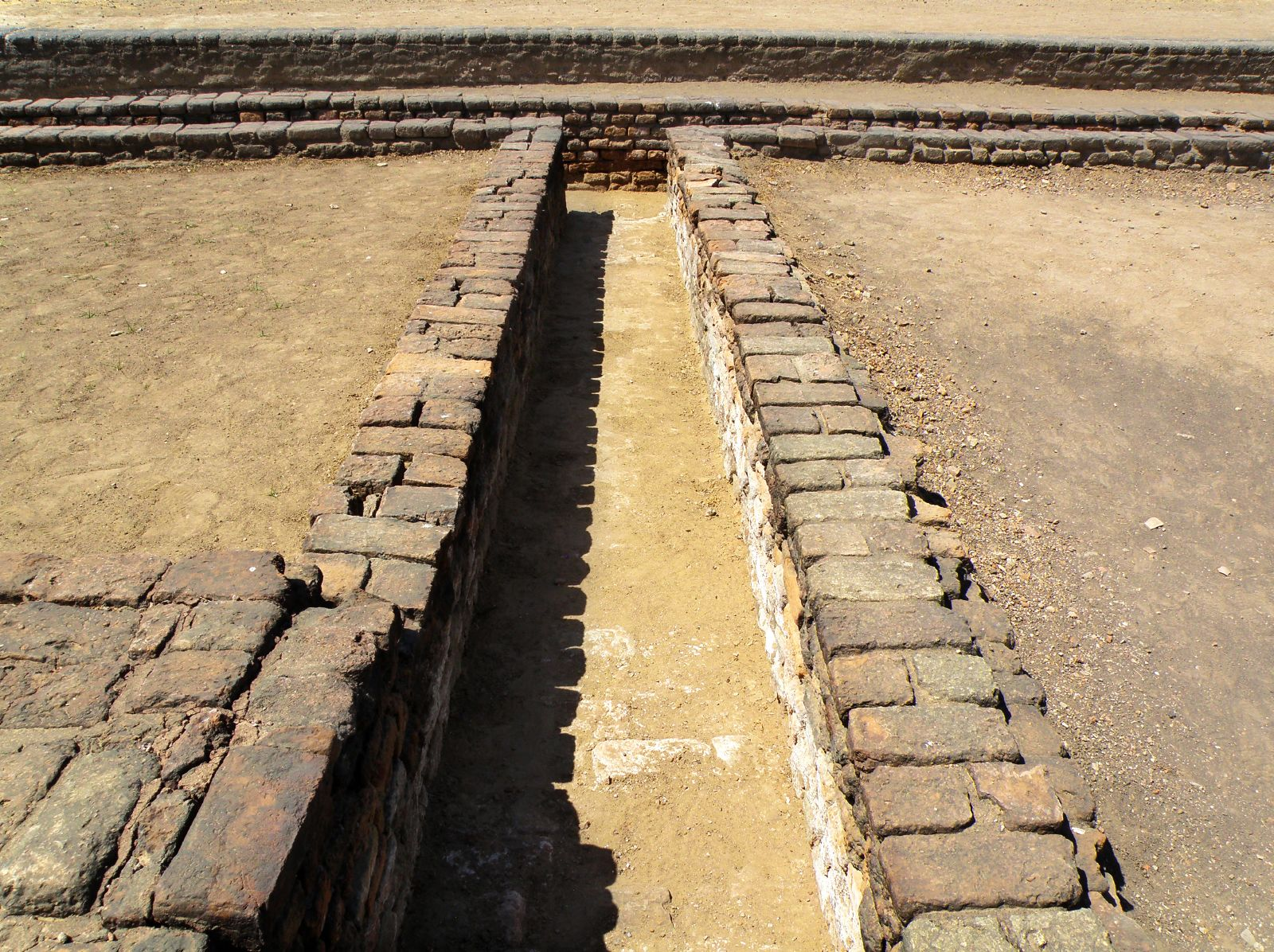
Remains of a drain at Lothal circa 3000 BC

The Indus Valley Civilization had sewerage and drainage systems. All houses in the major cities of Harappa and Mohenjo-daro had access to water and drainage facilities. Waste water was directed to covered gravity sewers, which lined the major streets.

=== 18th and 19th century ===
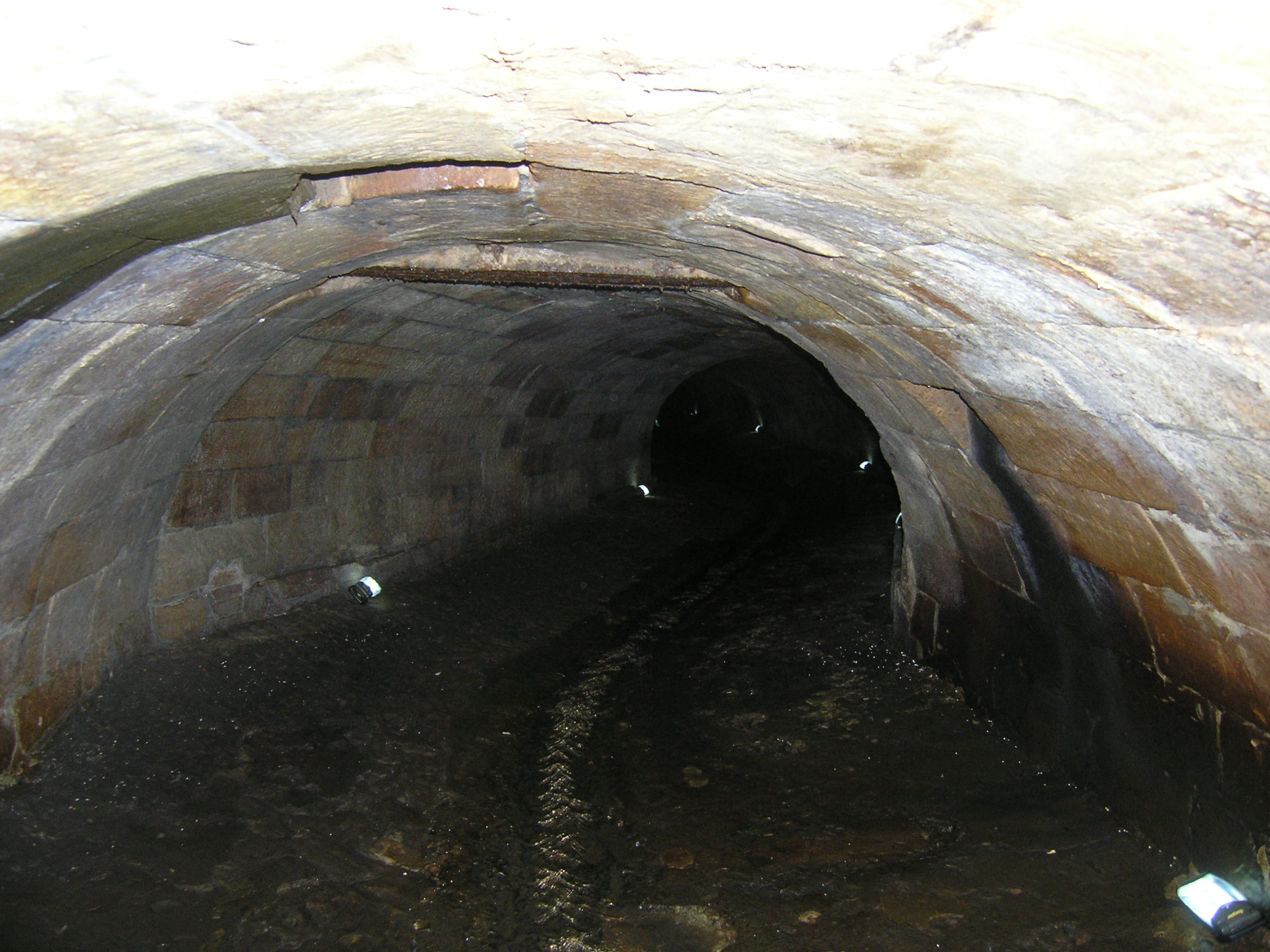
Tank Stream, a historical drain in the City of Sydney, Australia

The invention of hollow-pipe drainage is credited to Sir Hugh Dalrymple, who died in 1753.

== Gallery ==
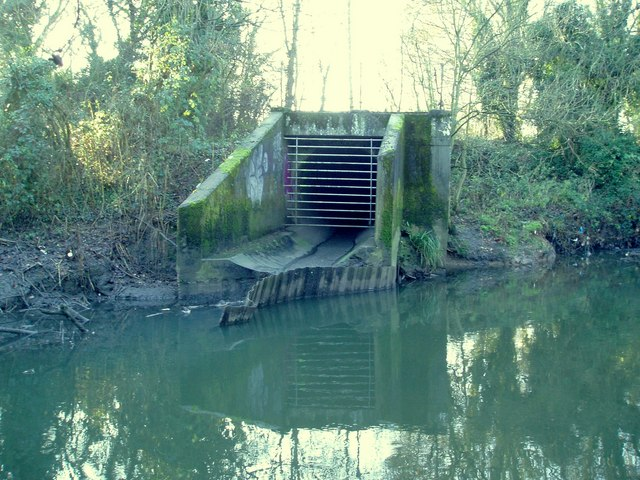
A storm drain discharging into the River Brent in the UK

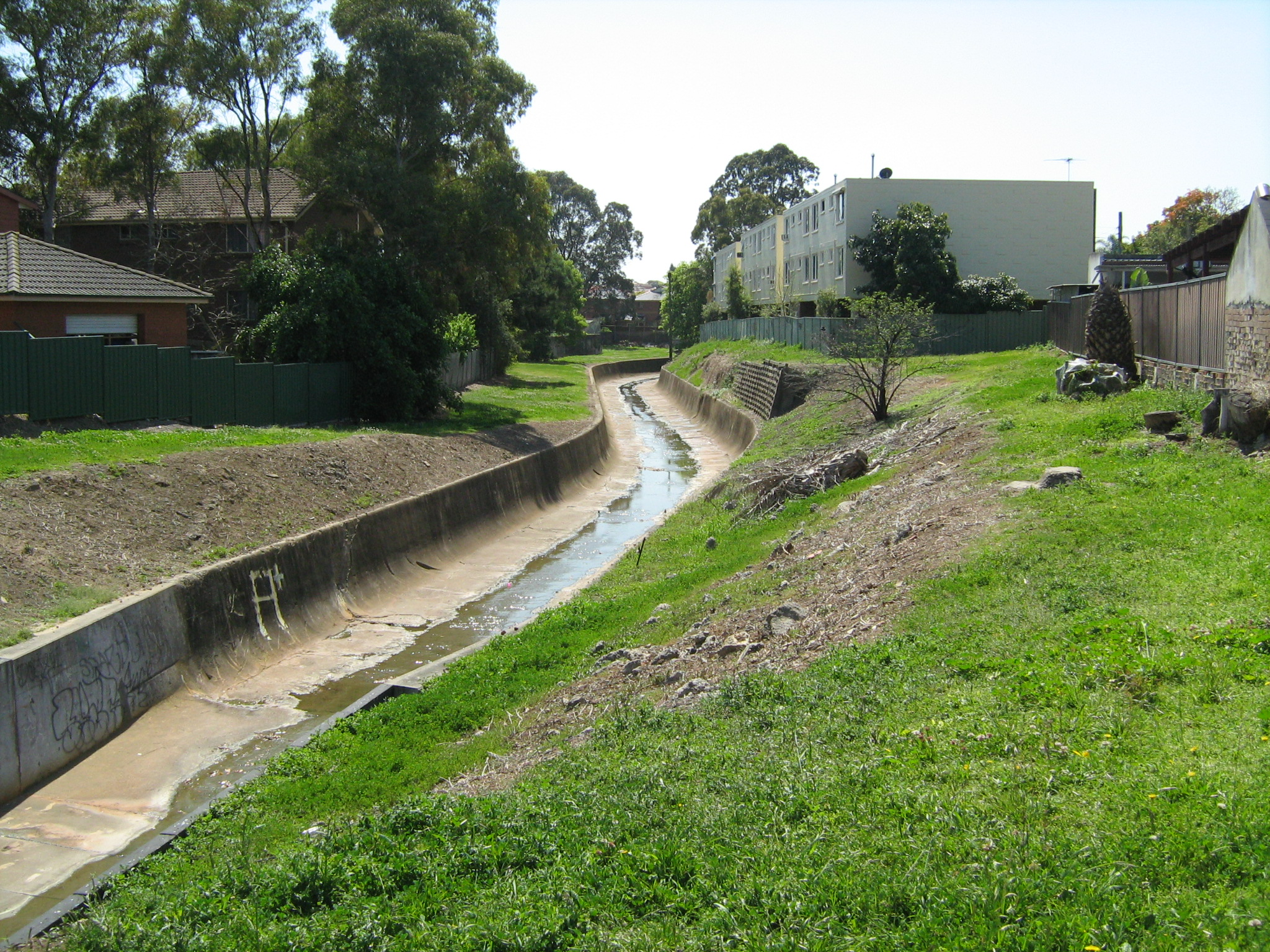
Iron Cove Creek, Sydney, Australia

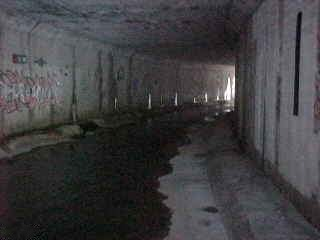
Inside a large reinforced concrete box storm drain in Mississauga, Ontario, Canada

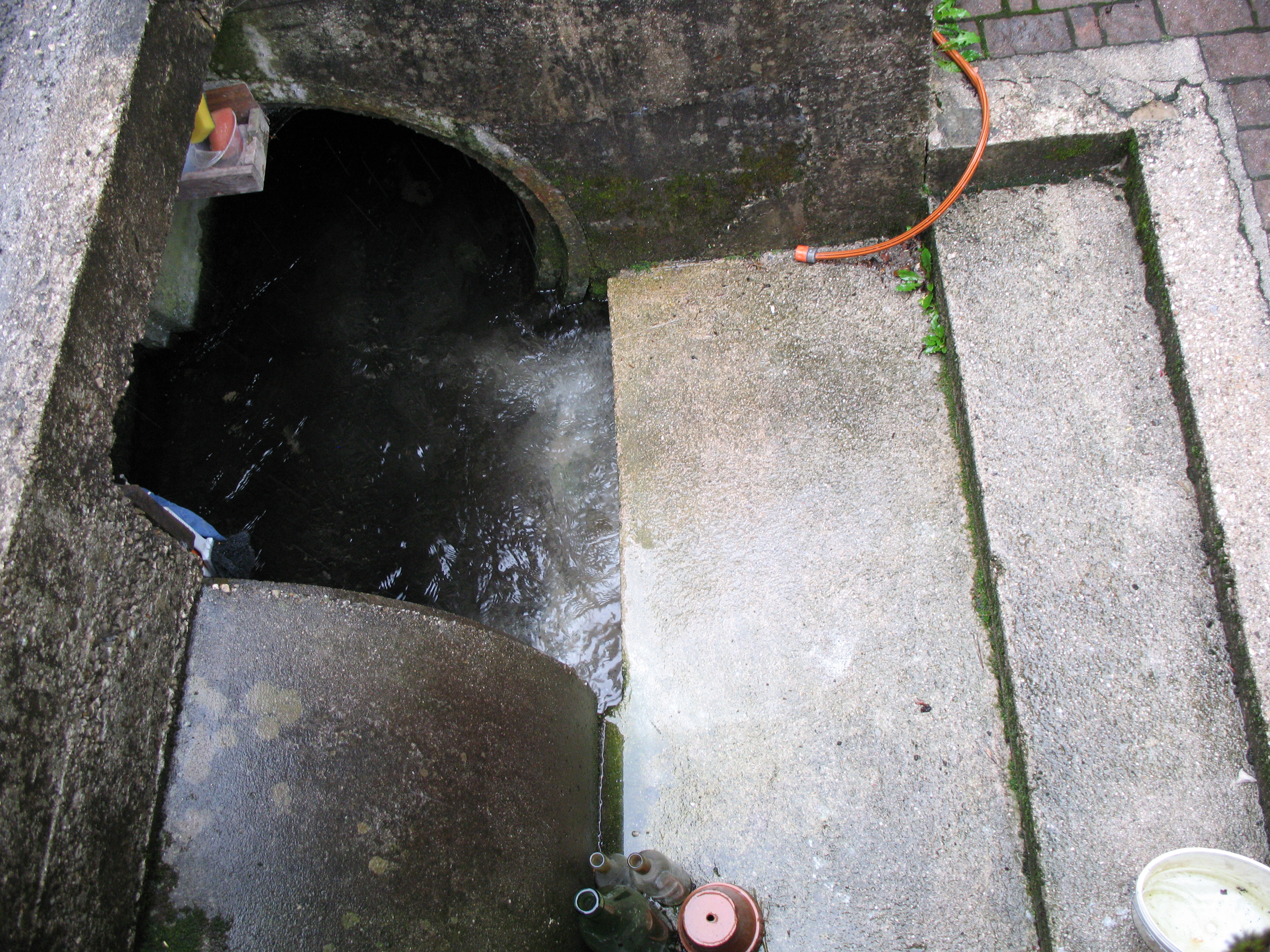
Storm drain in Obertraun, Austria

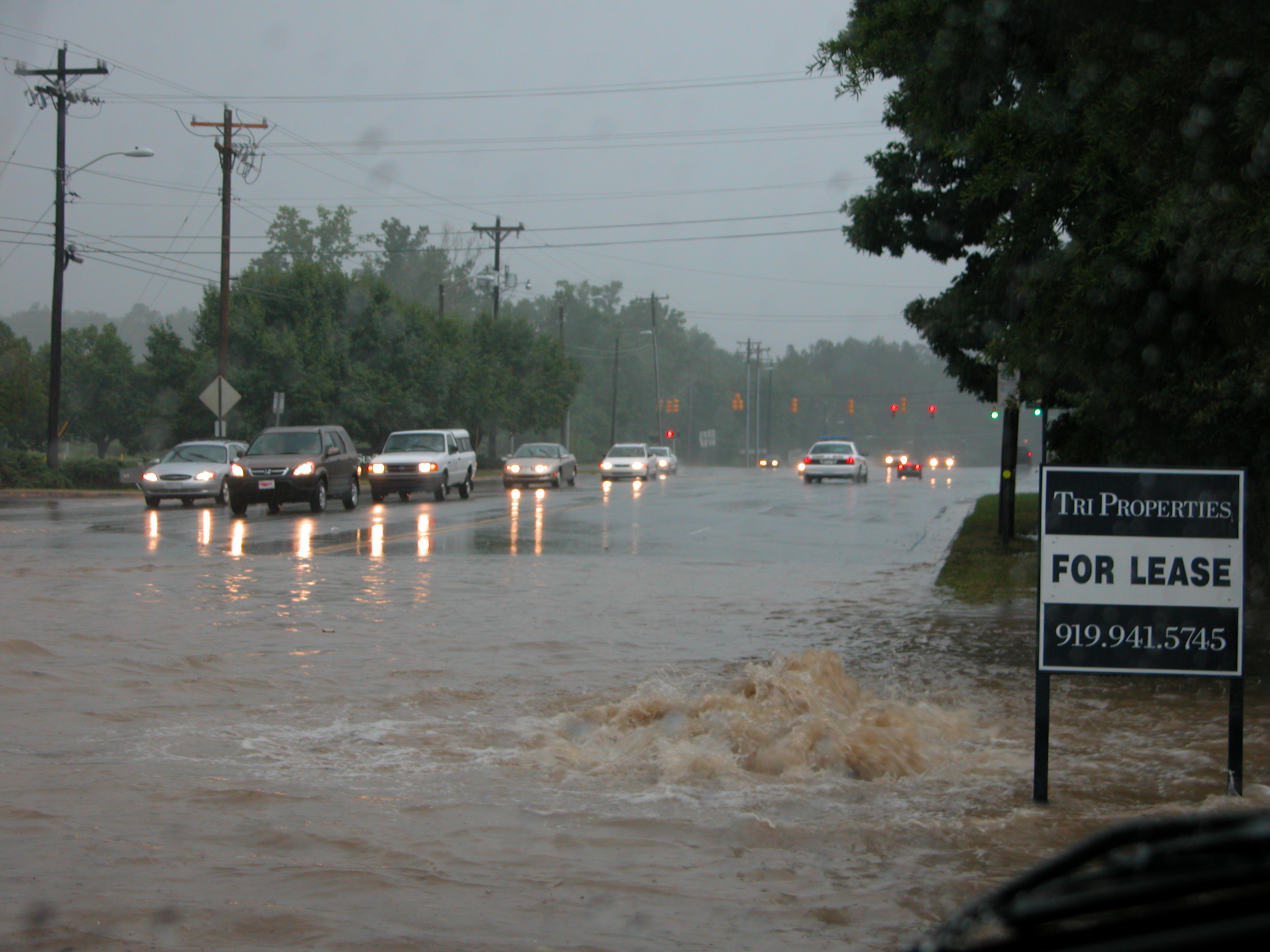
Storm drain overflowing in Durham, North Carolina

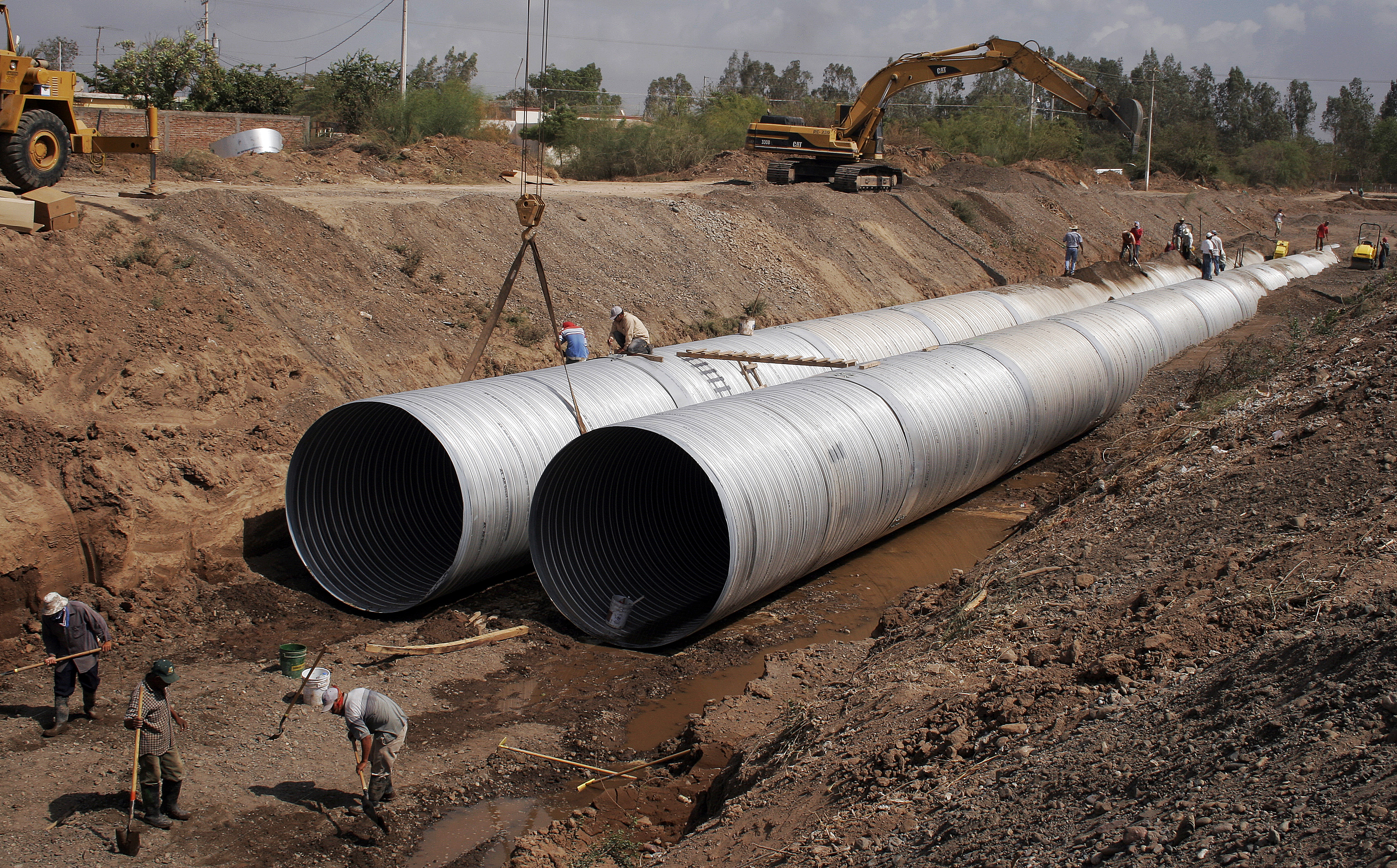
114" pipe installation; Pipe: 114" aluminized type 2; Flow: 25 cubic meters/second; This is a storm drain in Guasave, Mexico

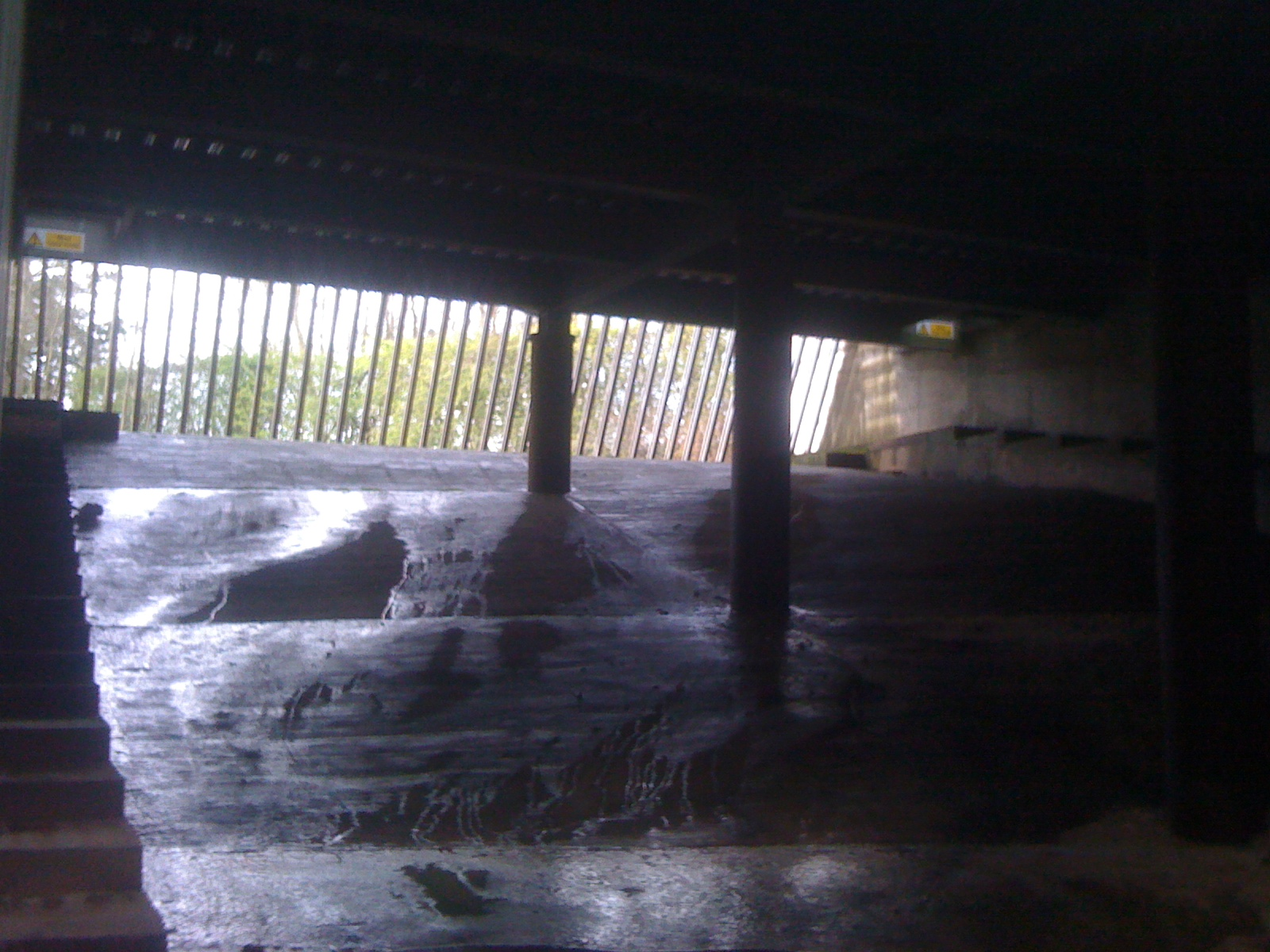
The inlet to a storm drain in Markeaton, Derby allowing a river to overflow into the storm drain

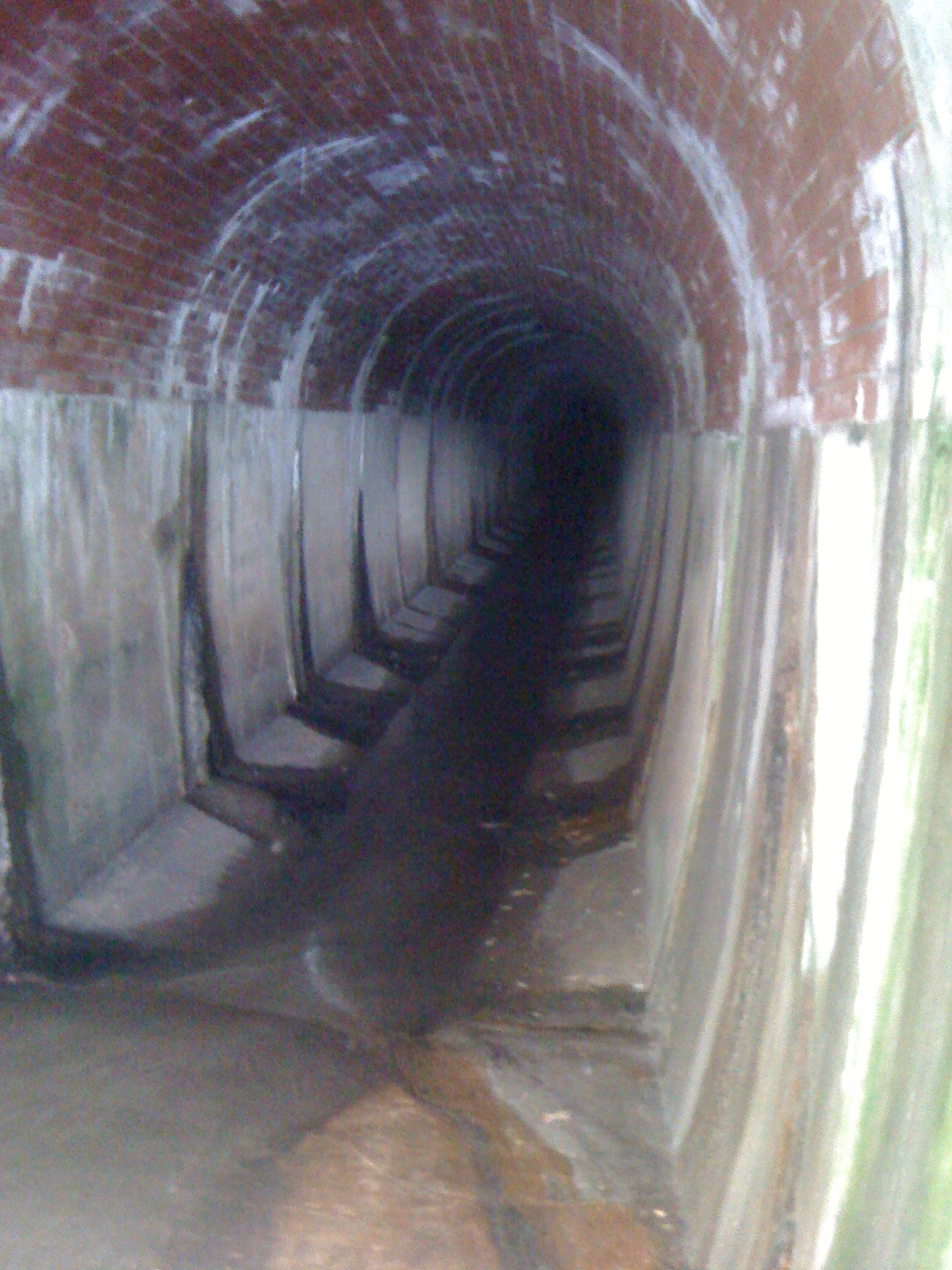
Inside the Markeaton Interceptor Storm Relief Culvert

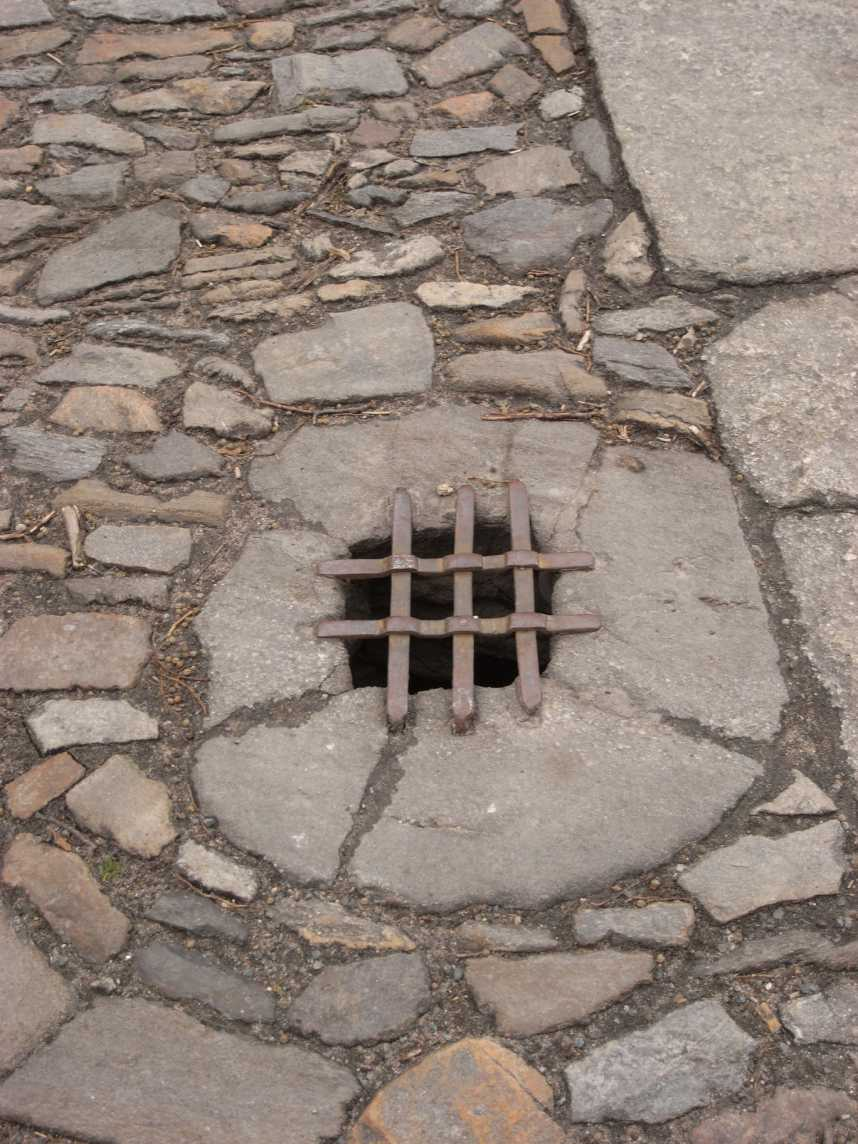
Old storm drain in Kutná Hora, the Czech Republic

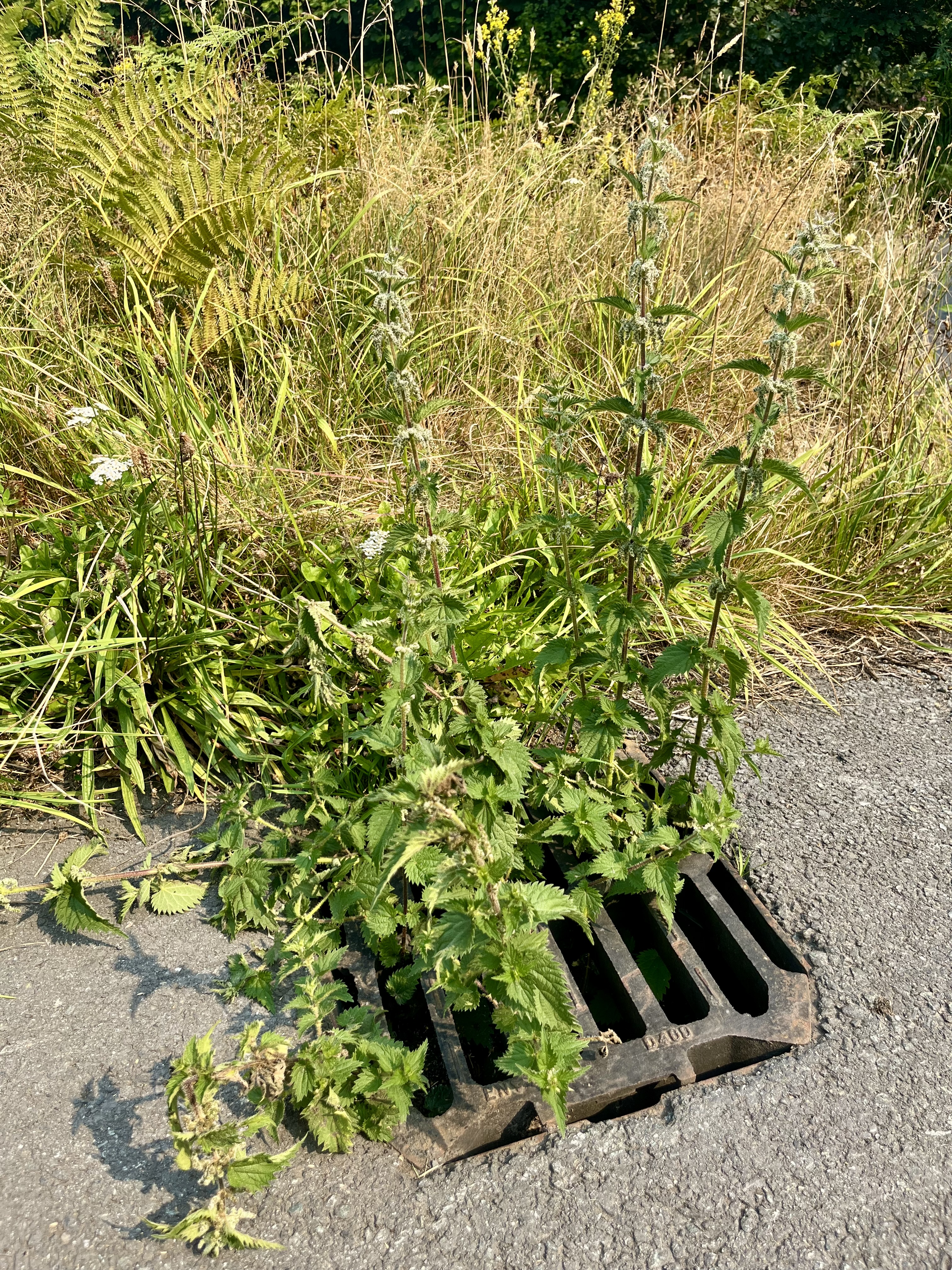
Urtica dioica (stinging nettle) growing from a storm drain in rural Wales, UK

== See also ==
- Urban runoff
- Water pollution
- Pervious concrete roads
