= Charles-Axel Guillaumot =

French architect

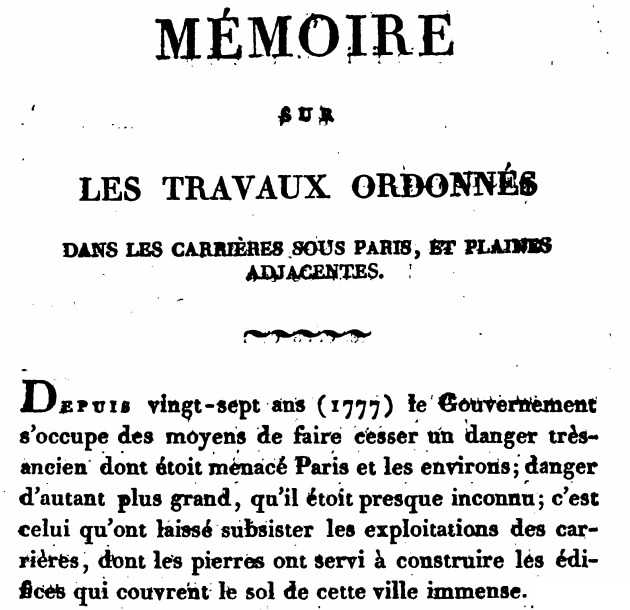
Title page of the first work published by Guillaumot, 1804.

Charles-Axel Guillaumot (French pronunciation: [ʃaʁl aksɛl ɡijomo]; Stockholm, February 1730 - Paris, 1807) was a French architect.

== Life ==
Born in Stockholm to French parents, he entered the Académie royale d'architecture in 1770. He was made the first Inspecteur Général des Carrières de Paris when it was created by a decree of Louis XVI on 4 April 1777 and held the post until 1791 and then from 1796 until his death (the longest-ever holder of the office). In this role he mapped the mines of Paris to enable better maintenance of public roads and royal buildings (he did not look into ones on private land), to reduce the risk of cave-ins and to re-use them as ossuaries (becoming the Catacombs of Paris). He was also Administrateur de la manufacture des Gobelins. He was buried in the cimetière Sainte-Marguerite, whose remains were later transferred into the ossuaries he had helped create.

== Main projects ==
- 1754-1756: 3 barracks for the Swiss Guards:
  - Rueil-Malmaison, what is now Guynemer, part of the Musée des Gardes suisses.
  - Louvre 1789 Redisign of the Salon Carée with a new Lanterne toplight, with international reception i.e. in the Munich Alte Pinakothek ed. al
  - the former caserne Charras in Courbevoie, inscribed as a 'Monument historique' in 1929, demolished in 1962, façade rebuilt in the park of the château de Bécon
  - Saint-Denis, destroyed in 1962
- Caserne de Joigny, in what is now quartier Dubois-Thainville
- Abbot's Palace in Vezelay (destroyed in 1792)

== Bibliography ==
- (in French) Caroline Girard, Charles-Axel Guillaumot (1730-1807), architecte et administrateur de la manufacture des Gobelins, p. 97-106, Livraisons d'histoire de l'architecture, 2004, Volume 8, nº 1 (lire en ligne)
- (in French) Franck Charbonneau, Yann Arribart, Yves Jacquemard, Charles-Axel Guillaumot; Premier inspecteur des Carrières de Paris, ACP, 2013 ISBN 9782953138016
