= Inspection générale des carrières =

French government agency

The Inspection générale des carrières (IGC) is the organisation which administers, controls and maintains the mines of Paris and catacombs of Paris. It was founded by royal decree of Louis XVI on 4 April 1777 as the 'Service des carrières du département de la Seine'.

== List of Inspectors General to 1911 ==
Name	Dates	Abbreviation
Charles-Axel Guillaumot	1777-1791	G
Noël-Laurent Duchemin	1791-1792	D
Pierre-Antoine Demoustier	1792-1793	2
François Jean Bralle	1793-1795	B
Charles-Axel Guillaumot	1796-1807	G
n/a (led by a commission consisting of Le Bossu, Caly and Husset)	1807-1809	Cmon
Louis-Étienne Héricart de Thury	1809-1831	HT
Jean Trémery	1831-1842	T
Chrétien-Auguste Juncker	1842-1851	J
Théodore Lorieux	1851-1856	L
Édouard Blavier	1856-1858	B
Charles-Louis de Hennezel	1858-1865	H
Charles Aimable Alban du Souich	1865-1866	S
Michel-Eugène Lefébure de Fourcy	1866-1870	F
André-Eugène Jacquot	1870-1871	E.J.
Lantillon	1871	
André-Eugène Jacquot	1871-1872	E.J.
Édouard Descottes	1872-1875	
Louis-Marcellin Tournaire	1875-1878	T
Ernest Gentil	1878-1879	
Émile-Louis Roger	1879-1885	R
Octave Keller	1885-1896	K
Charles Wickersheimer	1896-1907	W
Paul Weiss	1907-1911	

== External links (in French) ==
- Official website
- L'Atlas souterrain de la ville de Paris de 1976 à nos jours
- L'histoire de l'IGC
- Atlas des carrières de Paris et planches IGC
- Inspection générale des carrières
- Les plaques indicatives de l'IGC
- Les inscriptions souterraines
