= Lanterne (pasta) =

Type of pasta

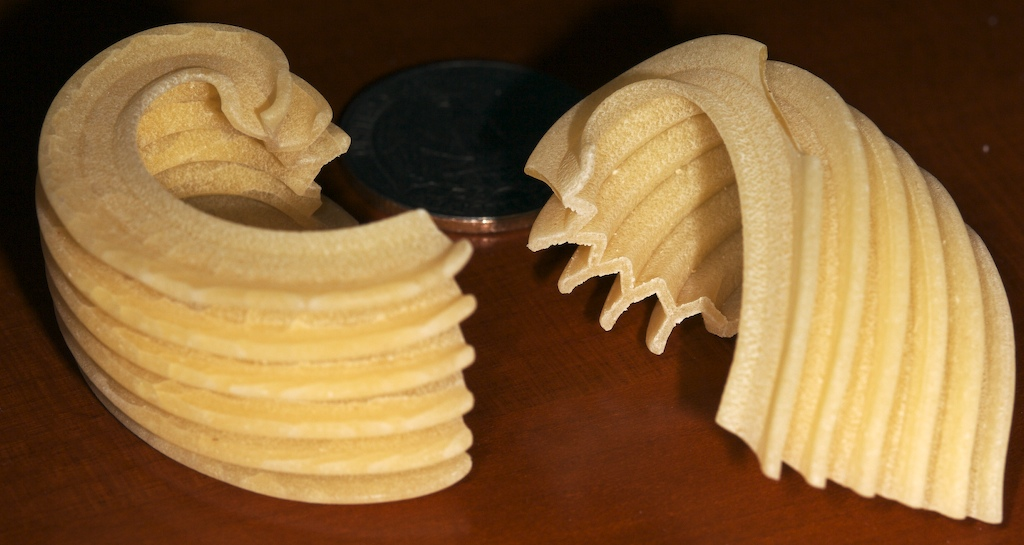
- Two lanterne
- Type: Pasta
- Place of origin: Italy

Lanterne (Italian: [lanˈtɛrne]; lit. 'oil lanterns'; sing. lanterna) are a type of pasta. They are curved and have deep ridges.

== See also ==
- List of pasta
- Lanterne (disambiguation)
