= Cimetière Sainte-Marguerite =

Former burial place in France

Coordinates: 48°51′11″N 2°22′52″E

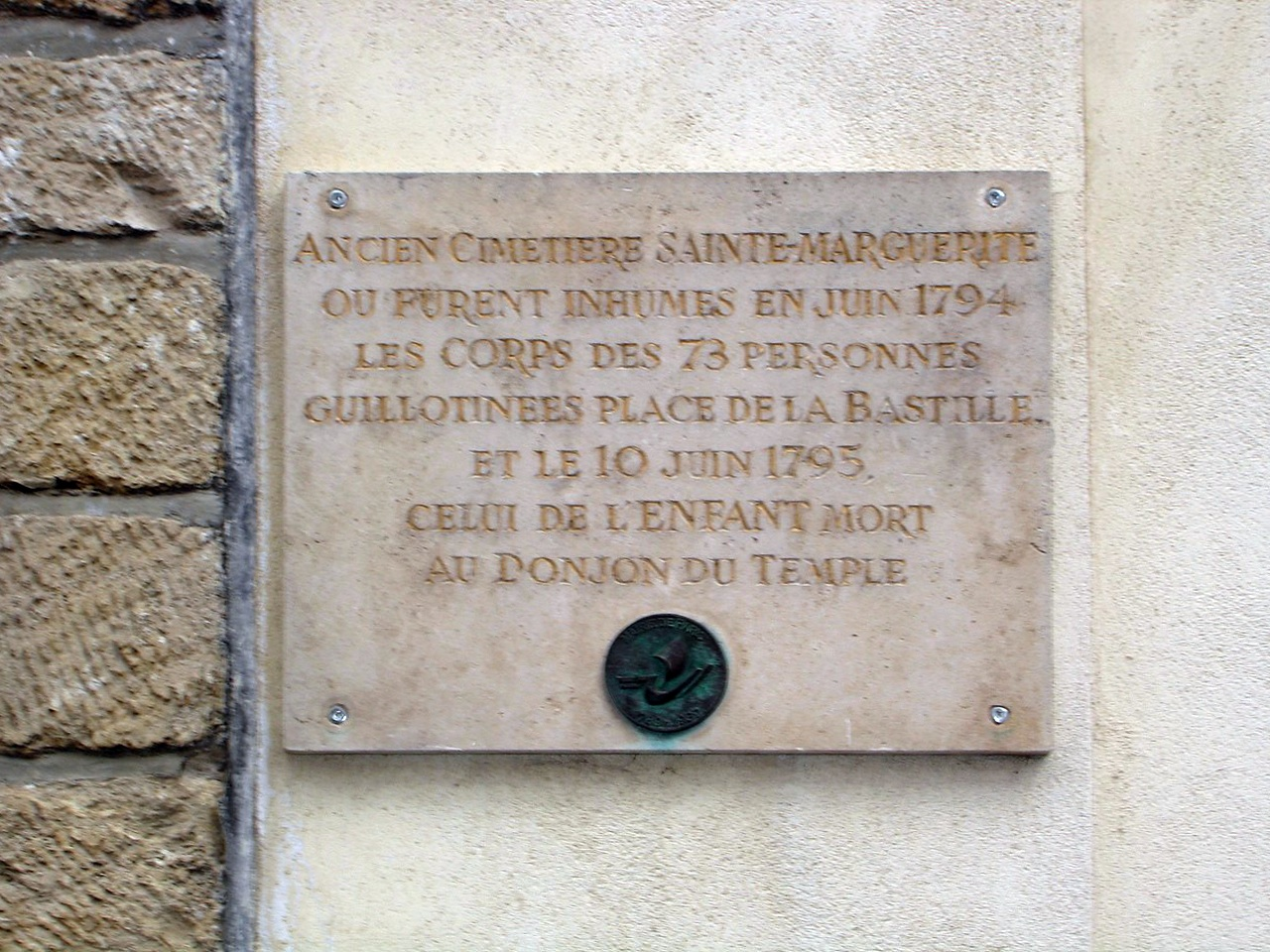
Commemorative plaque of the cemetery

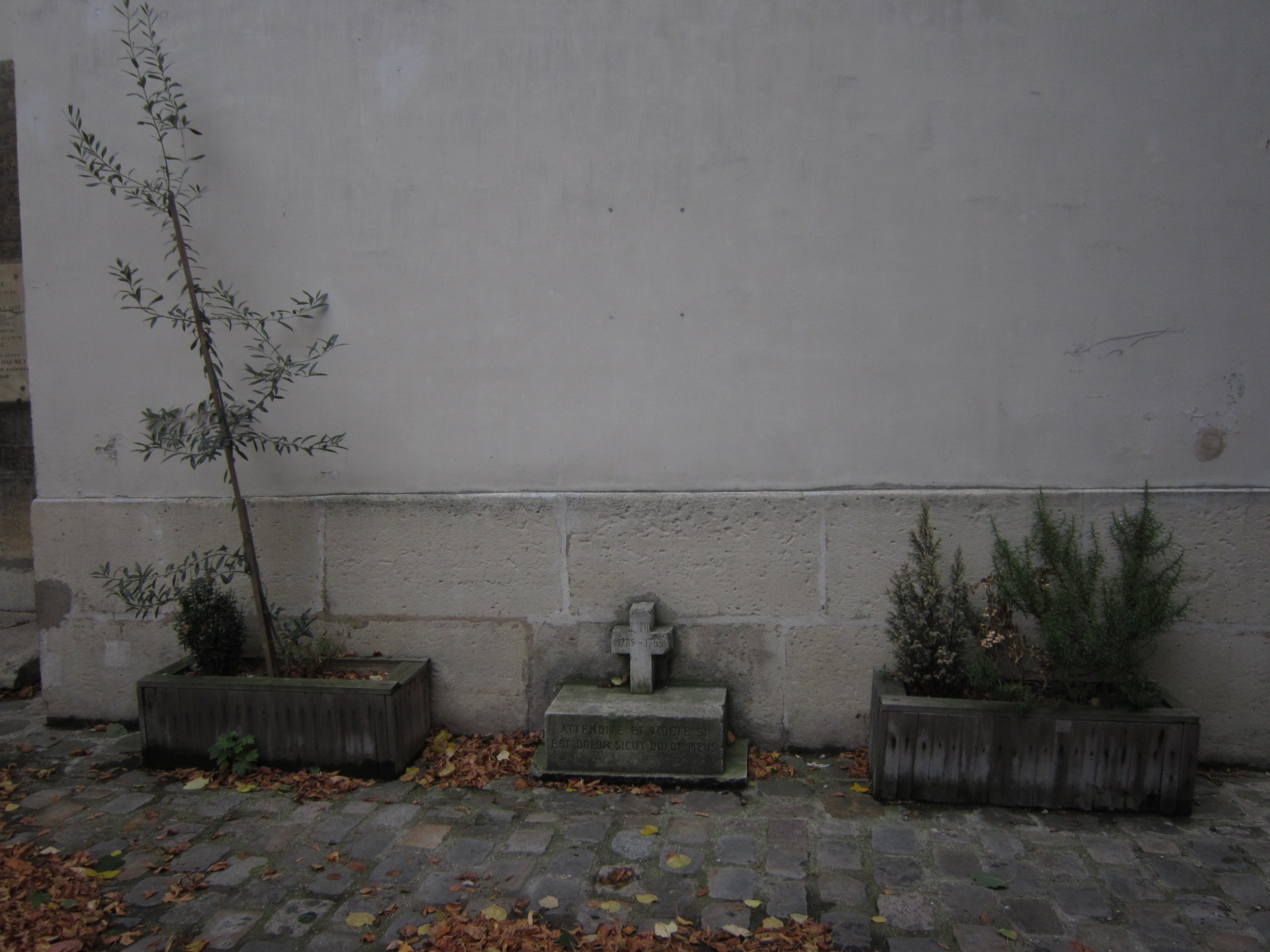
Tomb bearing the inscription “L... XVII (1787-1795)”

The Cimetière Sainte-Marguerite was a cemetery in a common ditch located between Paris and the village of Charonne during the French Revolution. It was level with 36 rue Saint-Bernard and beside Sainte-Marguerite church in the 11th arrondissement of Paris. It received 73 guillotined prisoners from place de la Bastille between 9 and 12 June 1794 then the first victims from place du Trône Renversé (now place de la Nation) before bodies from there started being sent to the cimetière de Picpus.

In November 1846, during the July Monarchy, abbé Haumet, parish priest of Sainte-Marguerite, planned building work on the church and checked its foundations, finding several burials, including the remains of an anthropomorphic lead coffin containing bones. The skull from among these bones was identified as Louis XVII. Re-exhumed in 1894, they were identified as those of a teenager aged between 14 and 18 or possibly older, whereas Louis died aged only 10.

== External links (in French) ==
- Cimetiere Sainte-Marguerite
- Le cimetière de Sainte-Marguerite
