= Sainte-Marguerite, Paris =

Roman Catholic church in Paris

Coordinates: 48.8529°N 2.3814°E

Saint-Marguerite, Paris
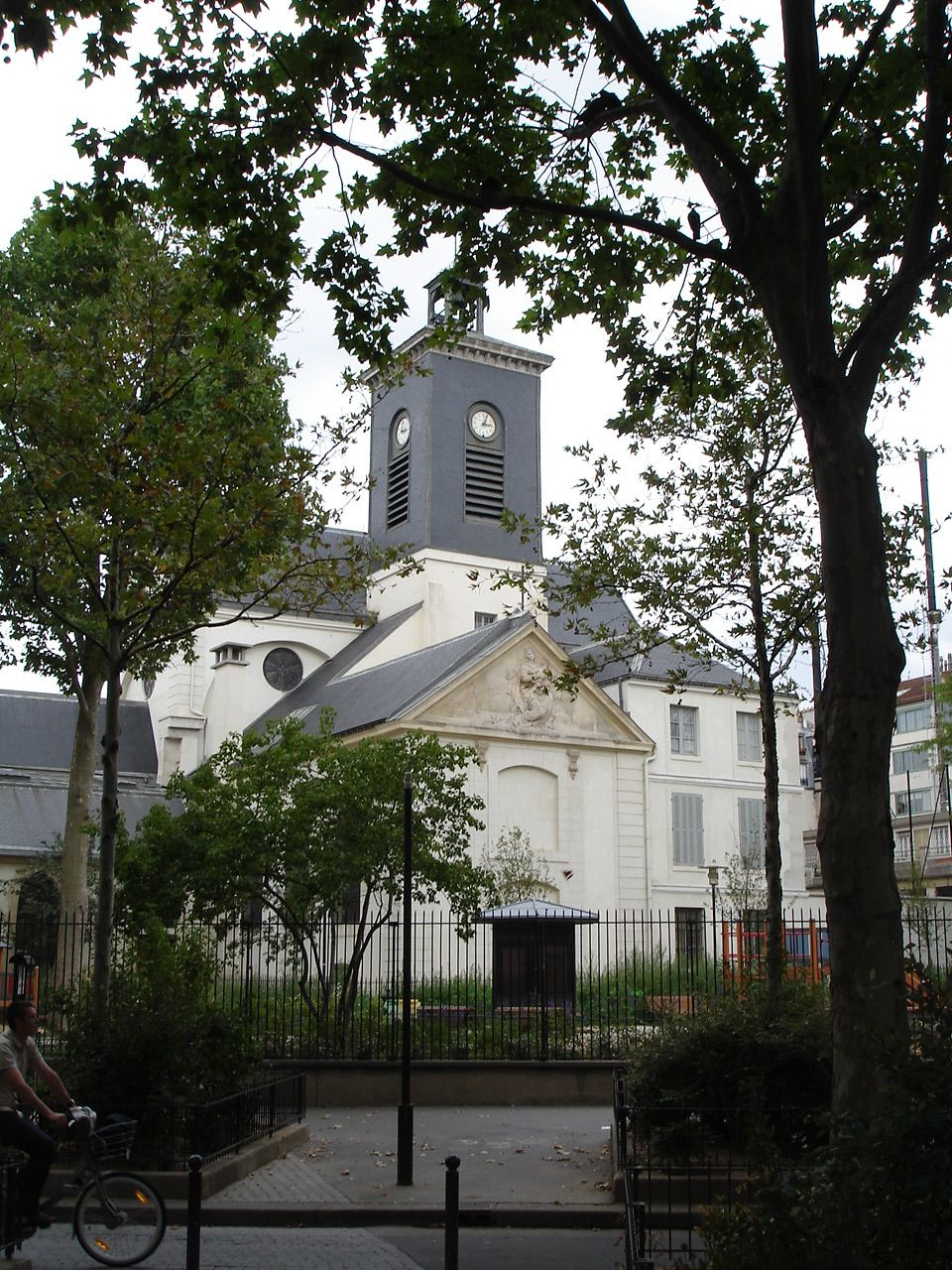
- Sainte-Marguerite, Paris

Religion
- Affiliation: Catholic Church
- Province: Archdiocese of Paris
- Rite: Roman Rite

Location
- Location: 36 Rue Saint-Bernard in the 11th arrondissement of Paris.
- Interactive map of Saint-Marguerite, Paris

Architecture
- Style: Neo-Classical
- Groundbreaking: 1625
- Completed: 1764

Sainte-Marguerite, Paris is a Roman Catholic church located at 36 Rue Saint-Bernard in the 11th arrondissement of Paris. It was founded in 1625, and constructed in a neoclassical style. A notable feature of the interior is the Chapel of the Souls in Purgatory, a chapel created by the architect Victor Louis between 1760 and 1764, using trompe-l'oeil murals to illustrate the values of antiquity and the Counter-Reform. The church was classified as a national historic monument by the French Government in 2017.

== History ==
A chapel dedicated to Saint Margaret the Virgin was begun on the site in 1625 in the Faubourg Saint-Antoine, then a rural and working-class neighbourhood. Construction continued in stages, with many interruptions, until 1764. During the French Revolution, it was one of the rare churches which was allowed to remain open; twenty-six of the thirty priests of the church took an oath to the Constitutional government in 1790, and put the church under the authority of the government. After 1795, it was declared a "Temple of Liberty and Equality", and, while the building survived, all of the paintings and sculptures disappeared. After the Revolution, the art was replaced with other works confiscated from churches that had been destroyed.

Steps of construction (1625-1764)

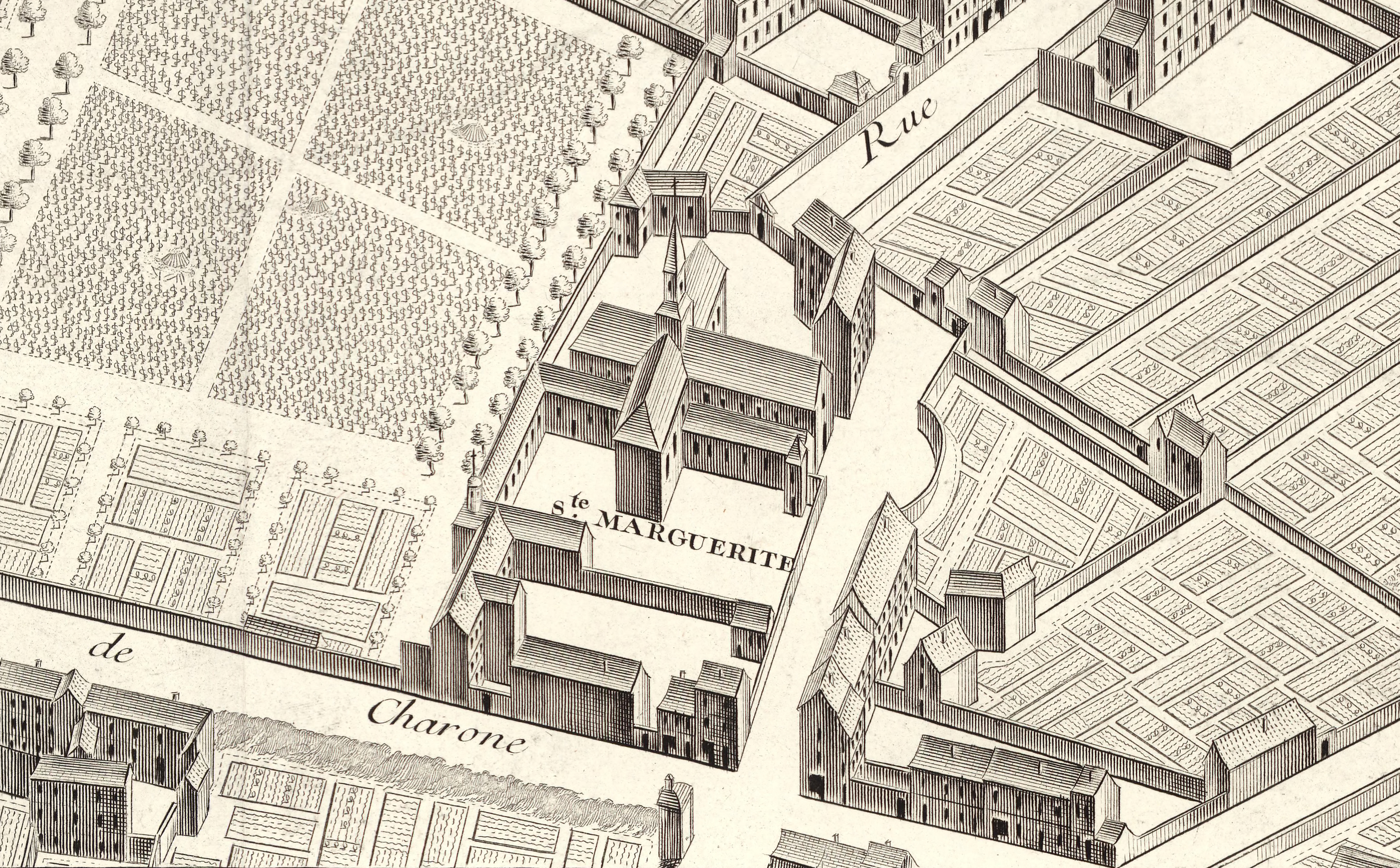
The church on the Turgot Map of Paris(1739)

It was widely believed that the body of the Dauphin Louis XVII, the ten-year old son of Louis XVI, executed during the Revolution, was buried in the cemetery adjacent to the church.. A plaque to that effect was placed on the wall of the cemetery. This story was investigated at the end of the 19th century, and a lead casket found in cemetery was opened, but the remains inside belonged to a man of age fifteen to twenty. This was confirmed in 1894 by a further forensic investigation.

== Exterior ==
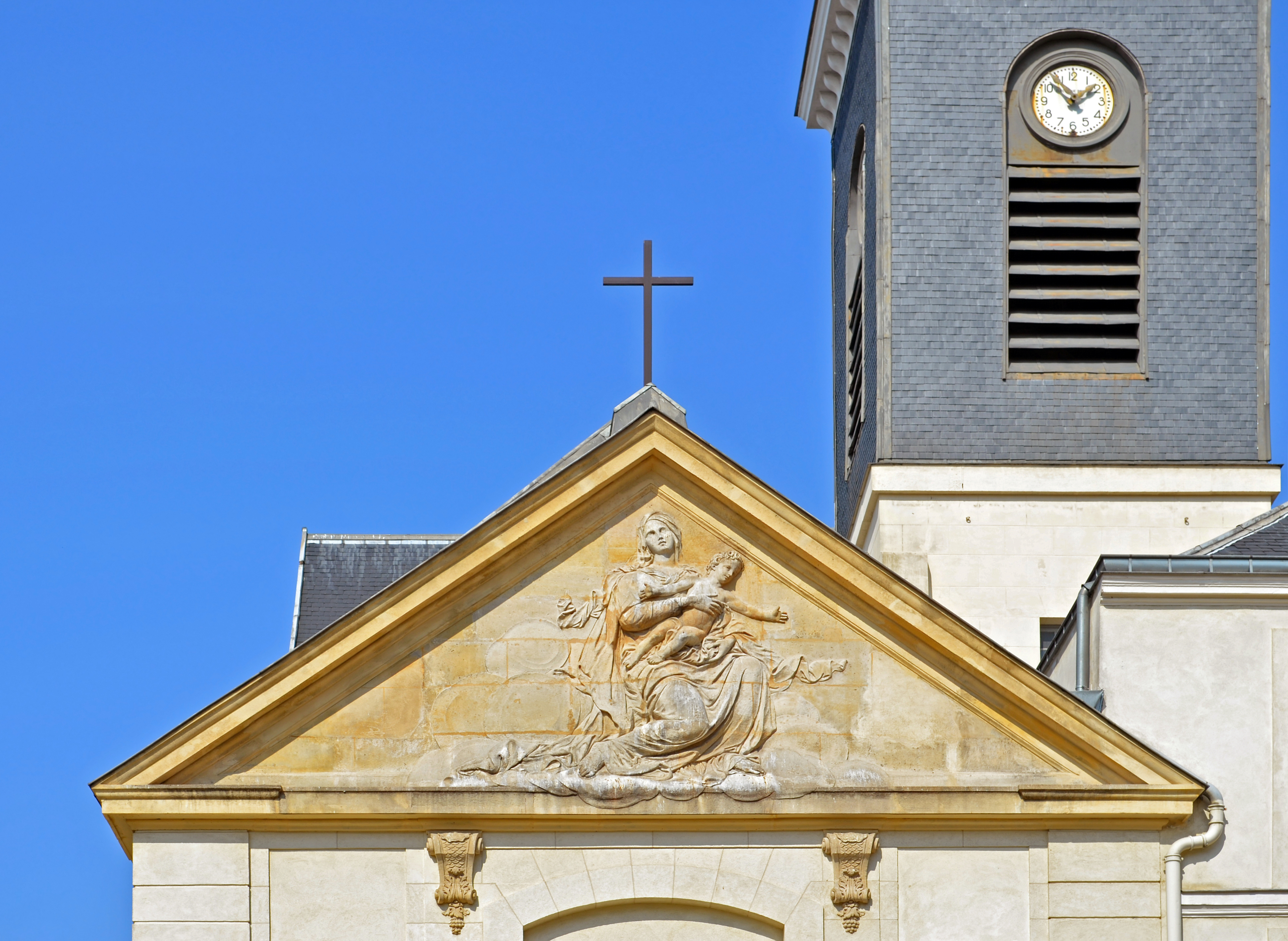
Church facade on Square Raoul Nordling

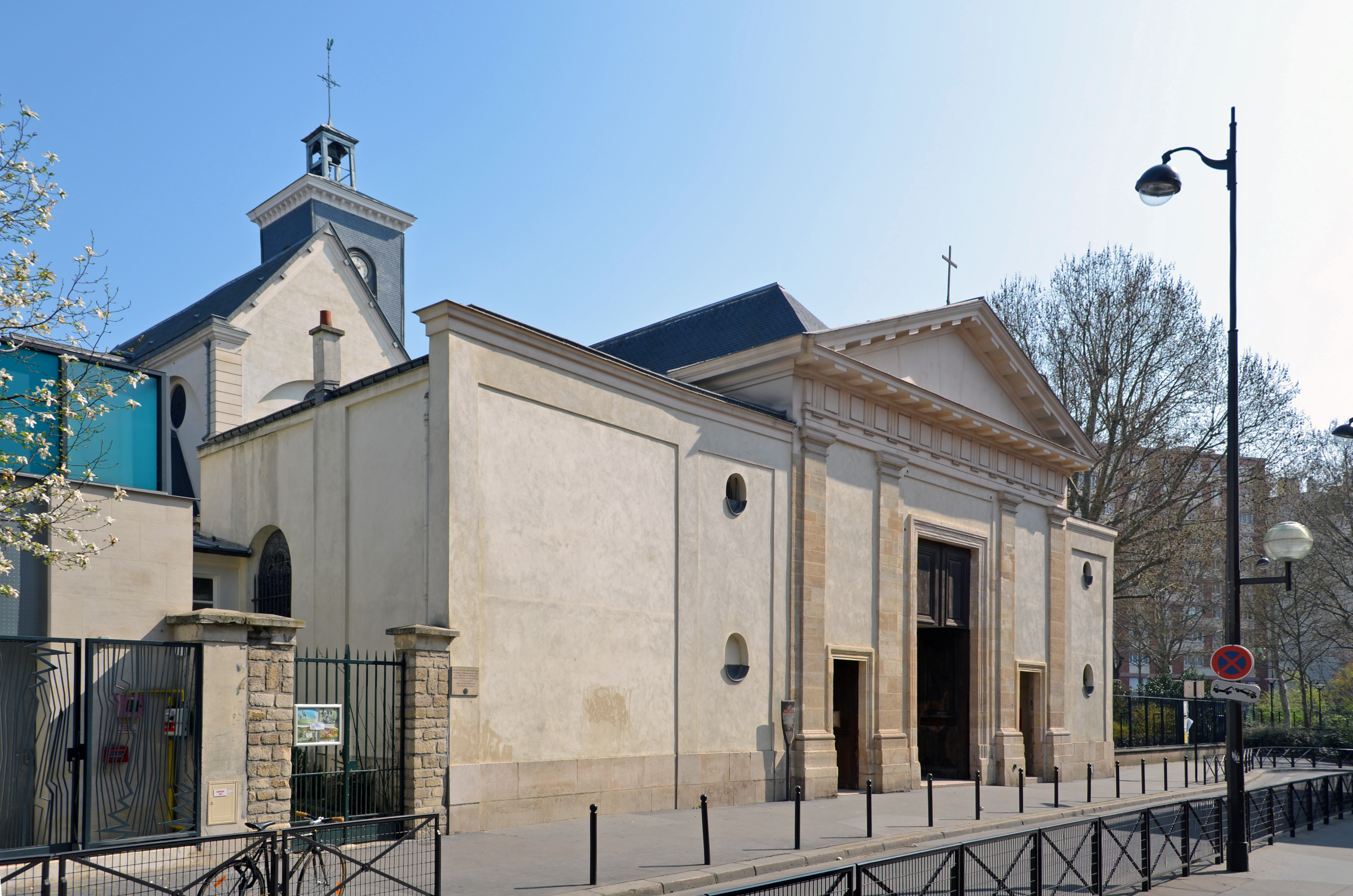
The church seen from Rue Saint-Bernard

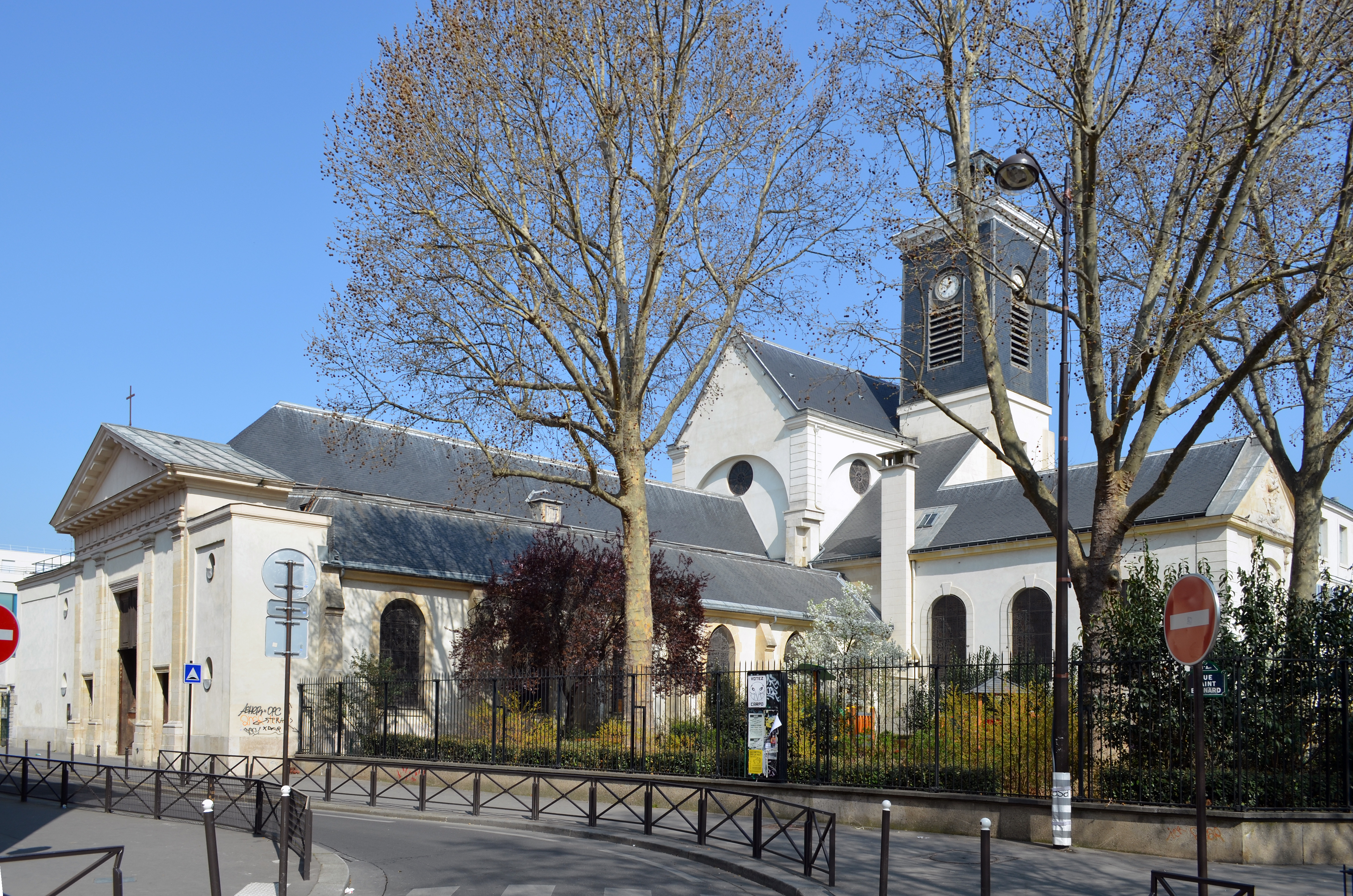
Exterior of the church

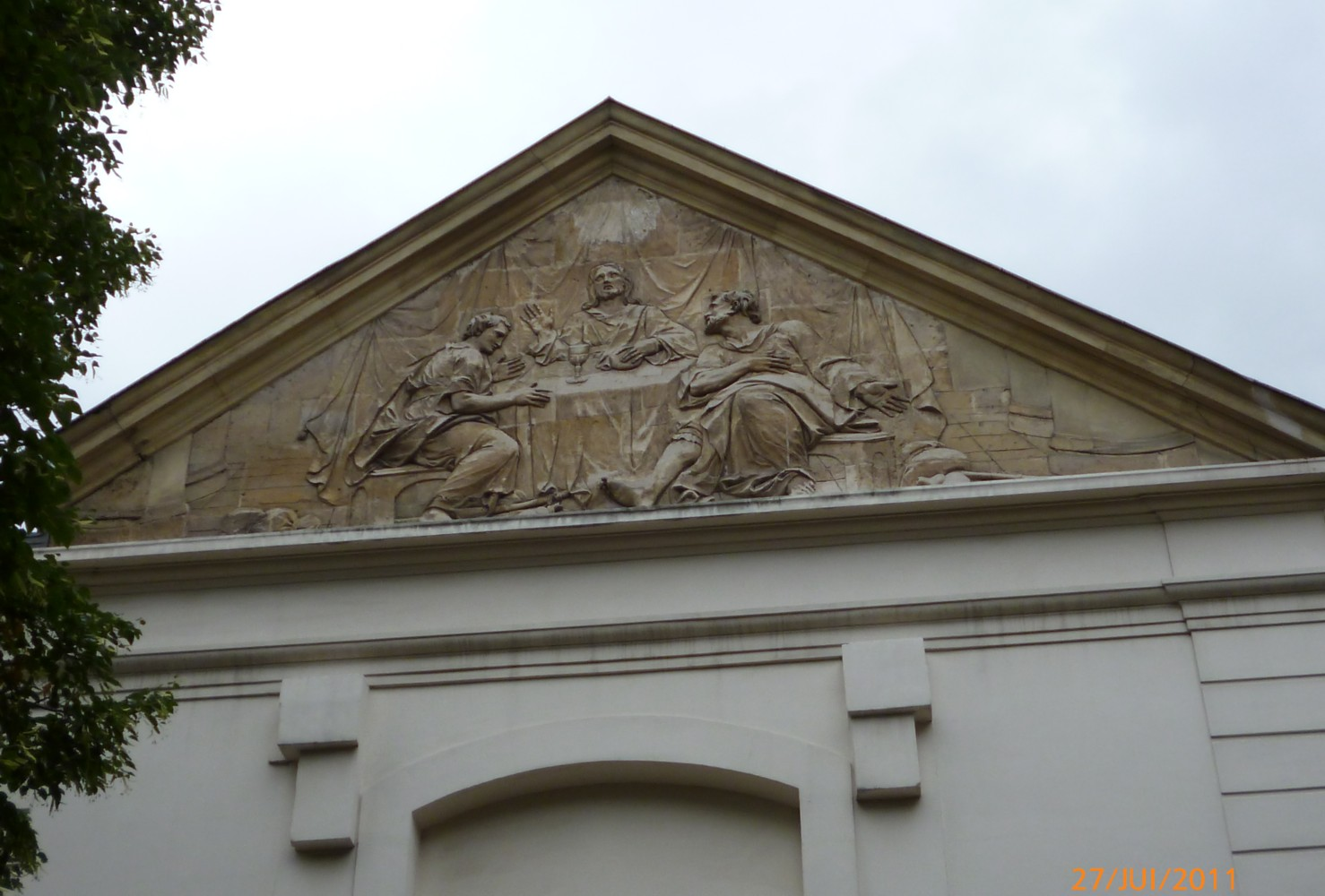
North fronton of the church

The decoration of the church exterior is neoclassical and minimal, following the turn away from the lavish Baroque style and a need to economise. The classical columns and pilasters follow the Doric order, and the triangular frontons on the facades have very simple decoration.

== Interior ==
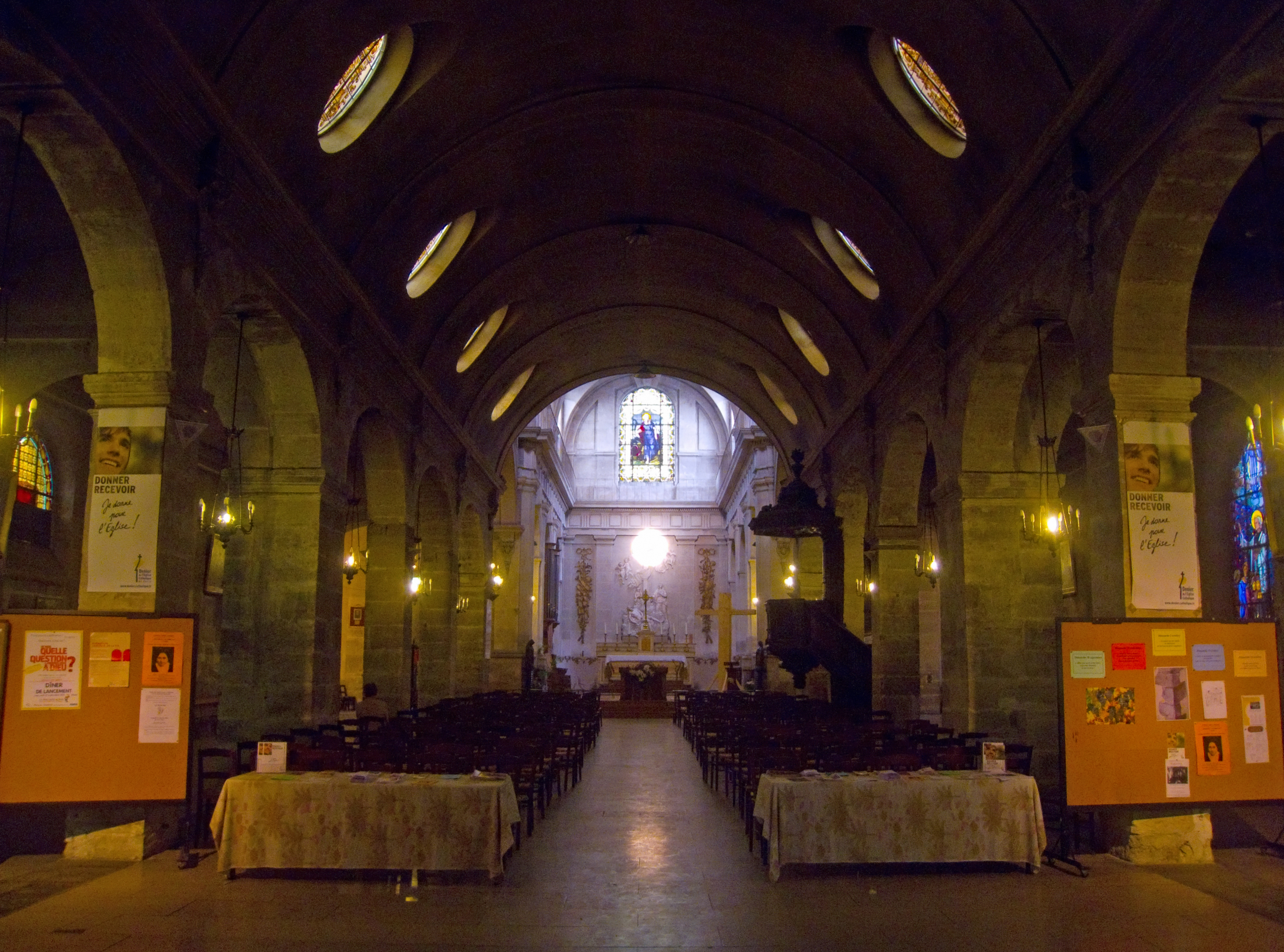
The nave

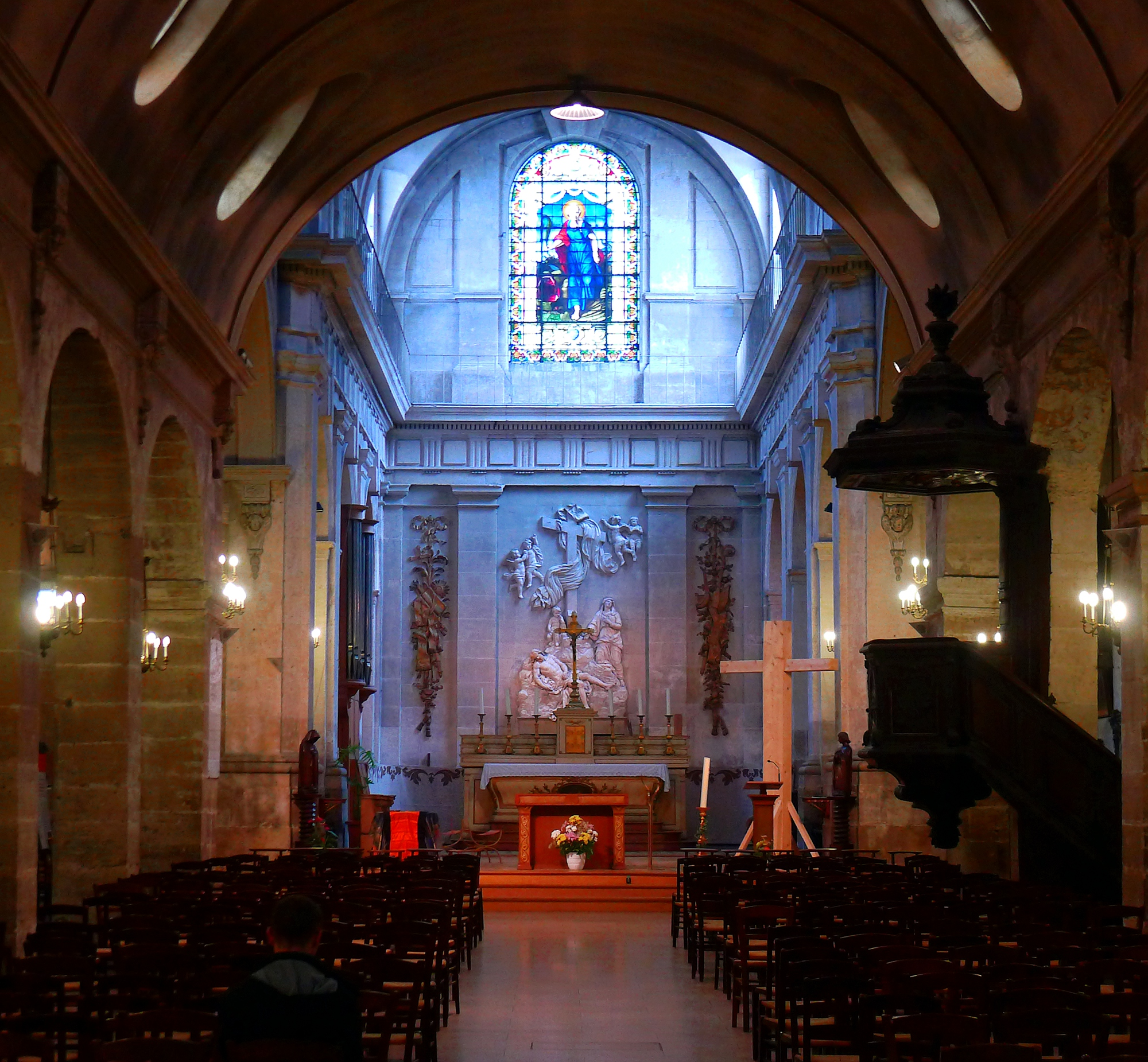
The choir and main altar

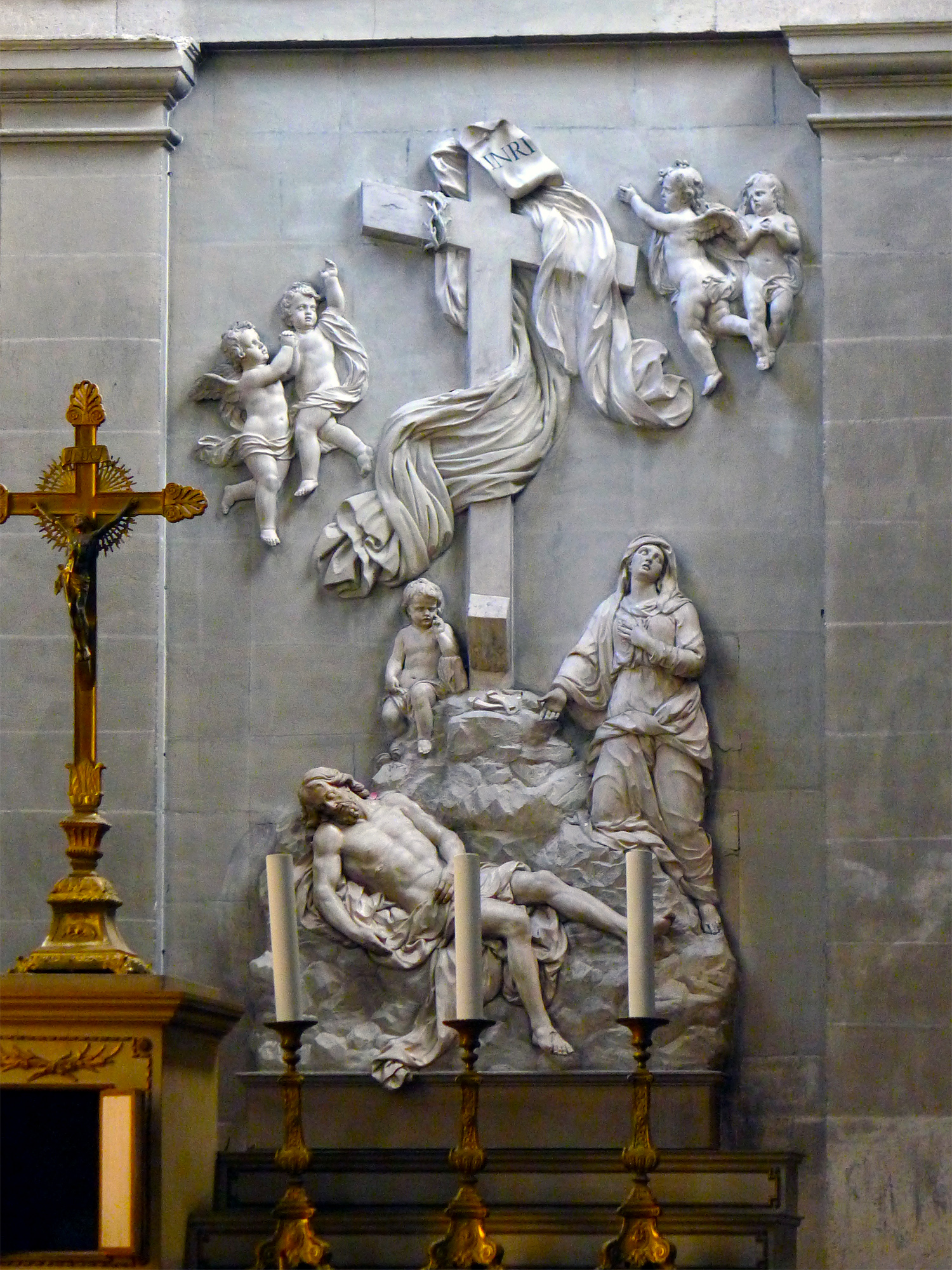
Bas-relief of "Christ descends from the Cross" by Eustache Nourrison and Robert de Lorrain

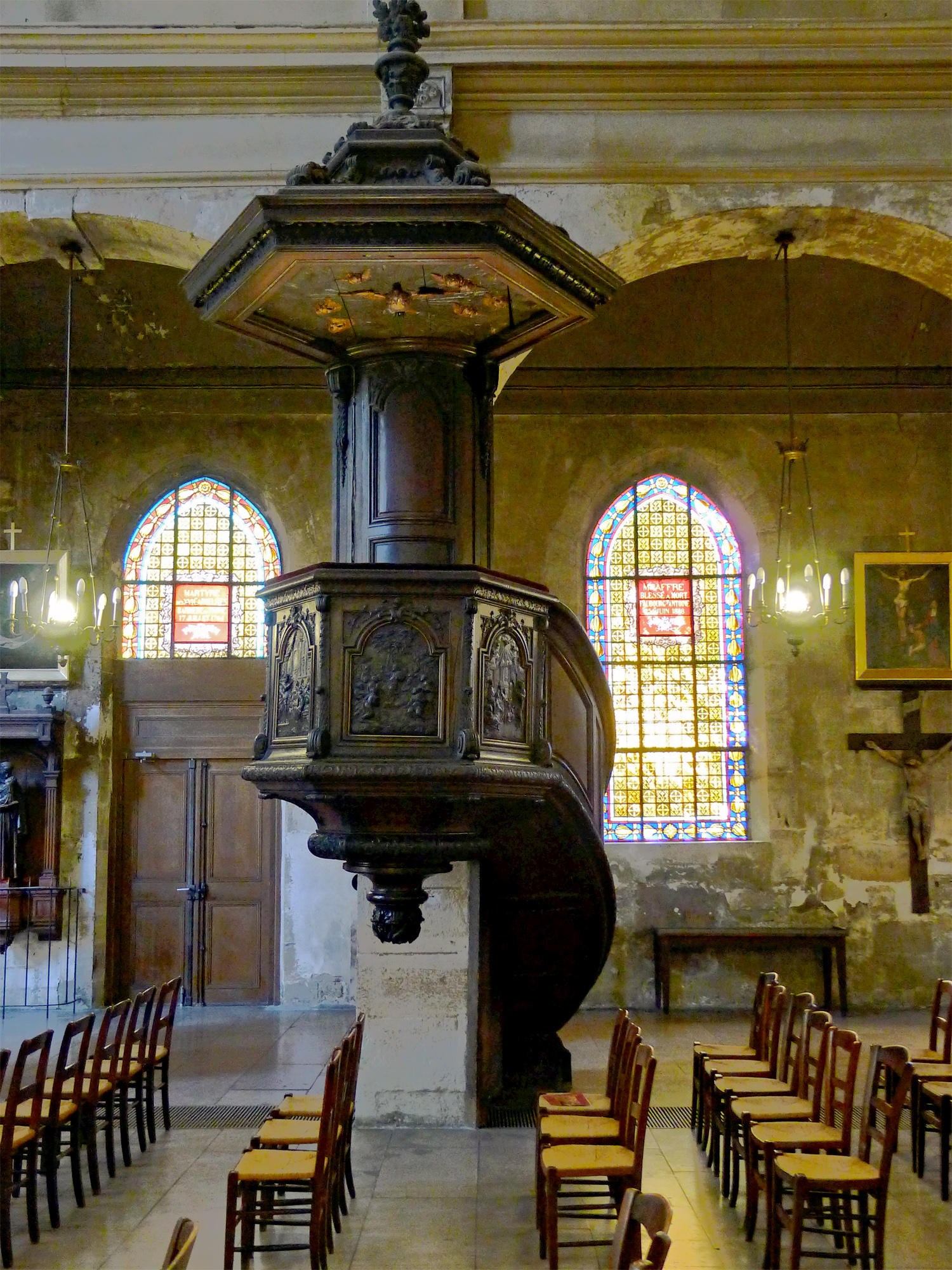
The pulpit in the nave

The rounded arches of the arcades of the long nave support the cradle vaults of the ceiling. The minimal light in the nave comes through a series of oval oculi, or small windows, creating a very somber atmosphere.

=== Chapel of the Souls in Purgatory ===
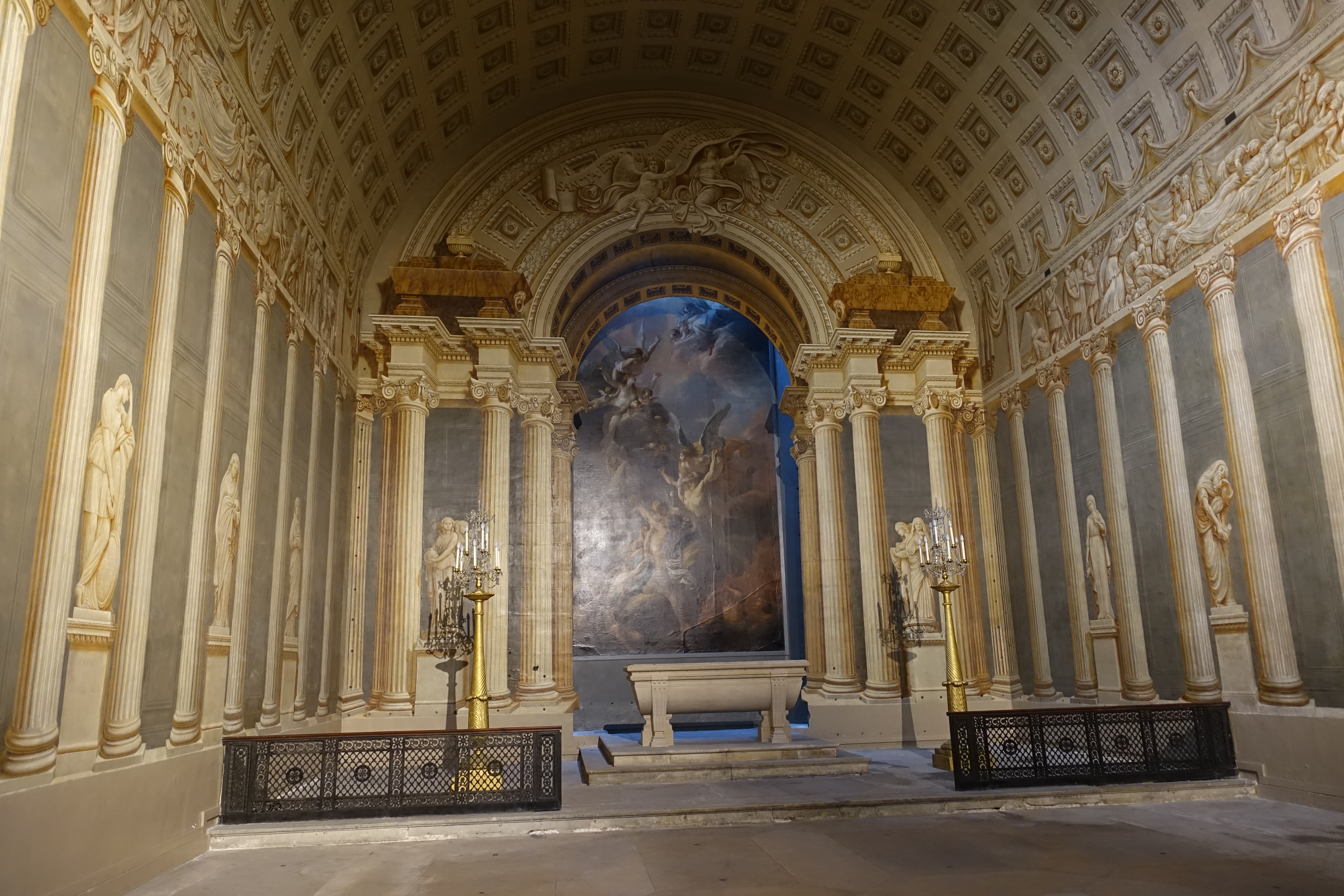
Chapel of the Souls in Purgatory

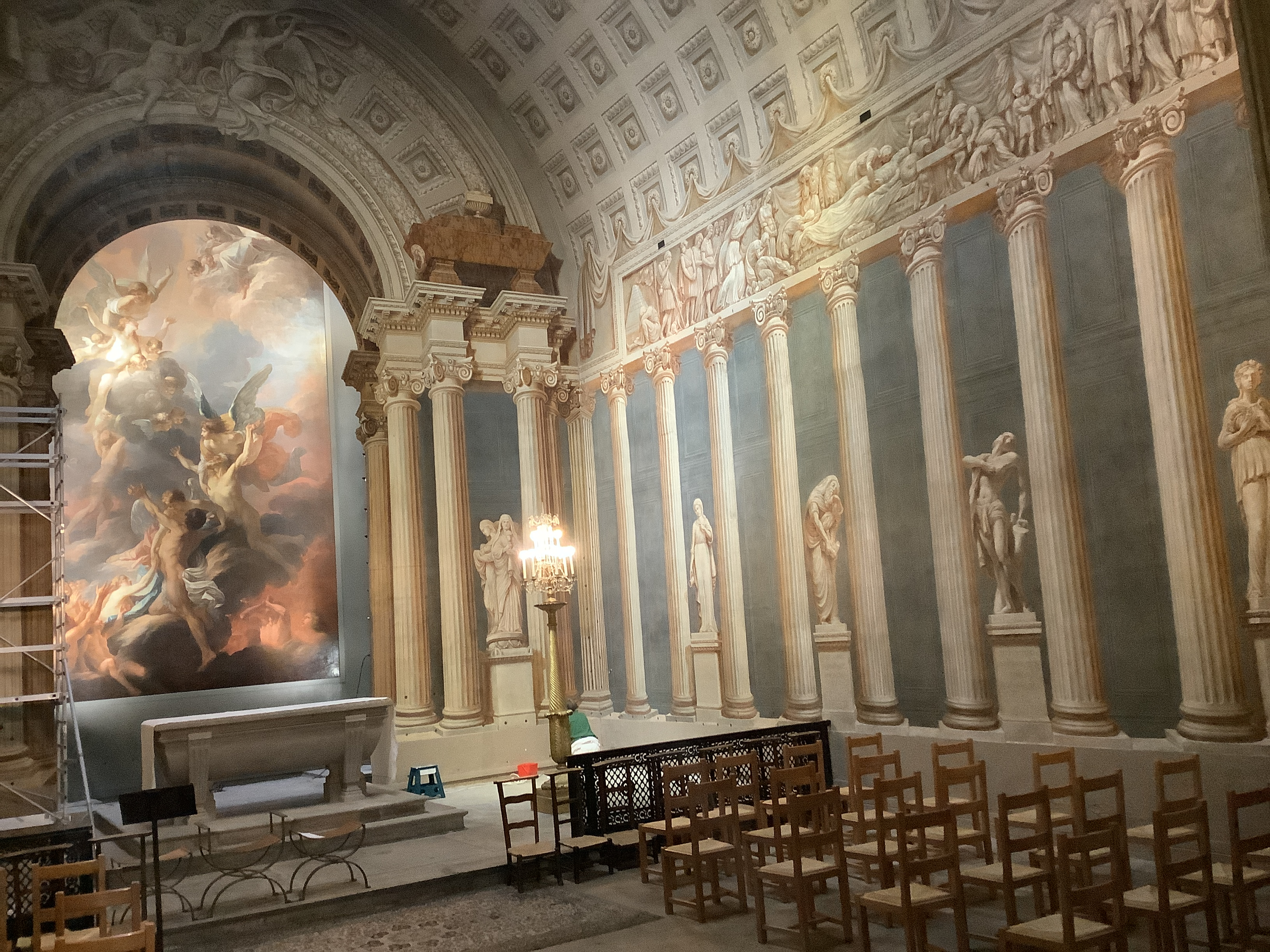
Side view of the trompe-l'oeil decoration

The Chapel of the Souls of Purgatory is one of the most unusual features of the church. It illustrates a doctrine put forward by the Council of Trent (1545-1563), describing the status of souls in Purgatory, sent neither to heaven or to hell; according to this doctrine, they wait in Purgatory to expiate their sins, before they are raised to heaven. The decor of the chapel is in trompe-l'oeil, with sculpture painted on the walls and ceiling to simulate three dimensions. The chapel was designed by architect Victor Louis, and built between 1760 and 1764 in the Neo-classical style. The painted architecture was designed by Paolo Antonio Brunetti (1723-1783). It was painted between 1760 and 1762. Another painter, Gabriel Briard, painted the statues located between the columns. Gabriel Briard also created the painting over the altar, representing "The Passage of the Souls in Purgatory to Heaven." He showed this painting at the Paris Salon of 1761.

== Art and decoration ==
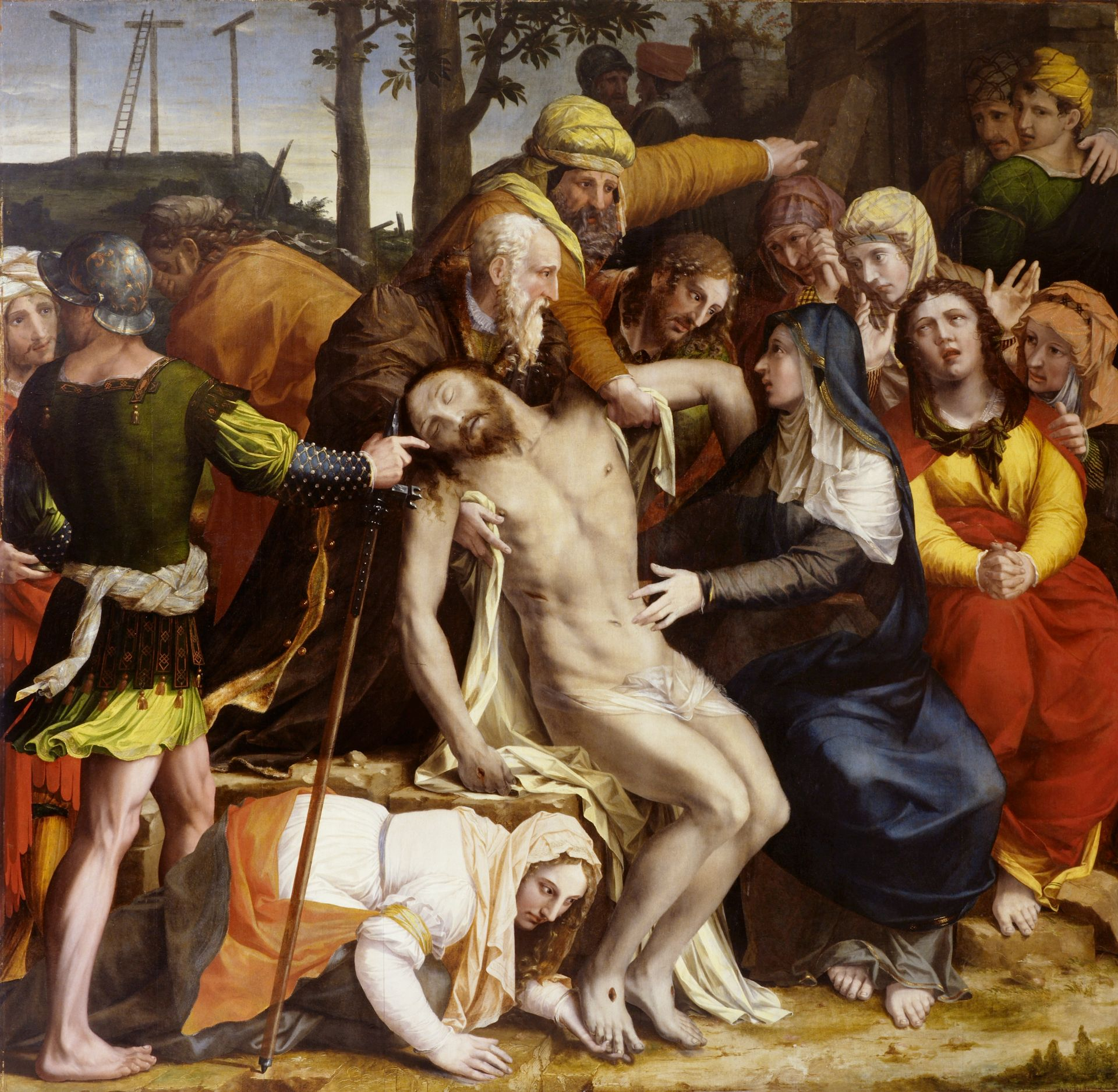
"Christ descending from the cross" by Charles Dorigny

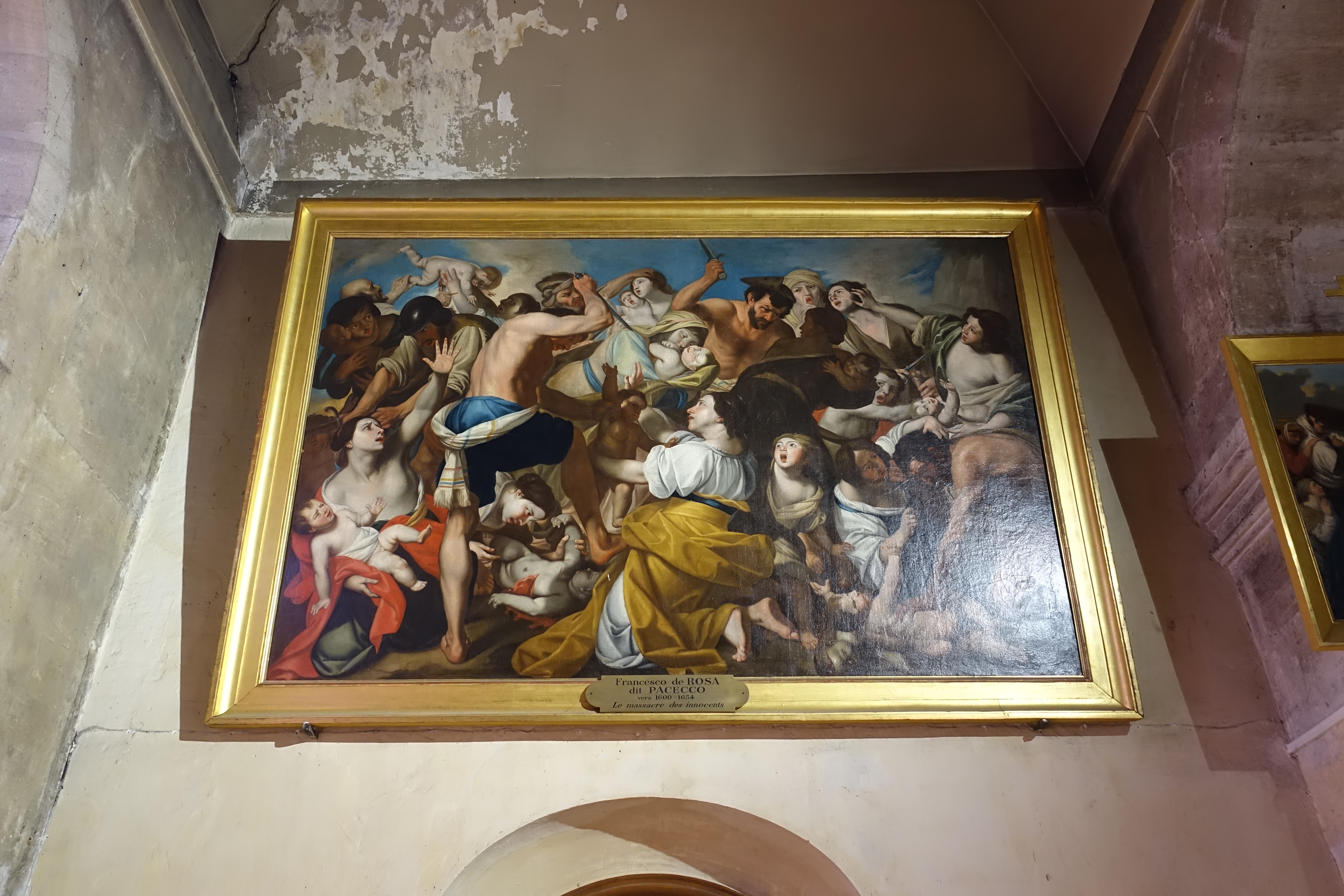
"The Massacre of the Innocents" by Francesco de Rosa

Several of the most important art works in the church are displayed here. They include the "Descent from the Cross" by Charles Dorigny. It depicts the suffering of Christ, surrounded by Mary, Mary-Madeleine, Nicodemus and the other Apostles, surrounding the body of Christ. The figure of Joseph of Aramathea has the features of King Henry IV of France, who was in the last years of his reign when the painting was made.

The choir at the east end, where the clergy have their stalls, is decorated with another of the major art works in the church; parts of funeral monument to Catherine Duchemin, the wife of the sculptor François Girardon, best known for his sculpture in the gardens of the Palace of Versailles. This is a work in the Baroque style entitled "Christ taken down from the Cross", by two students of Girardon, Eustache Mourrisson and Robert Le Lorrain.

=== Stained glass ===
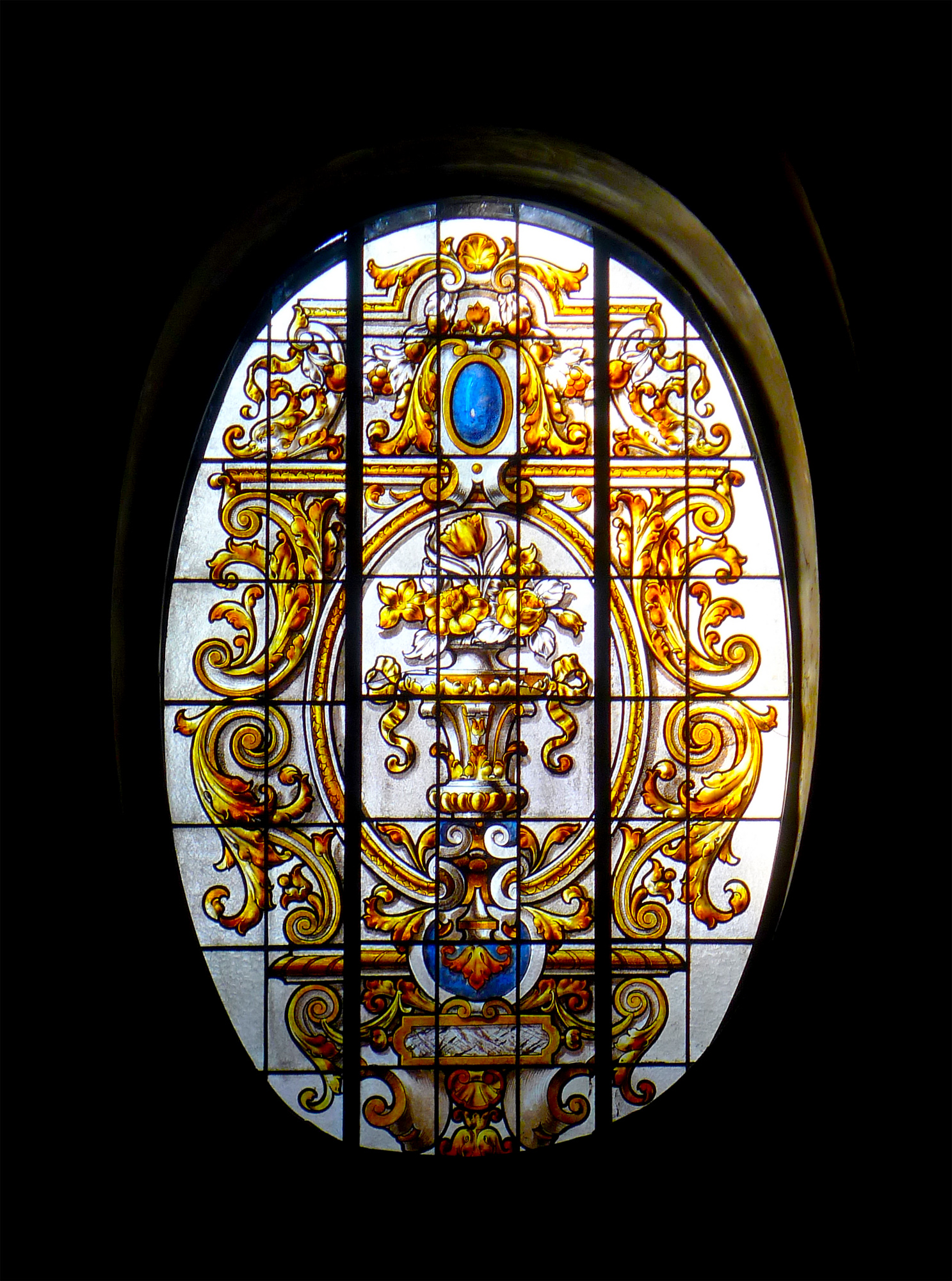
An upper window of the nave (19th c.)

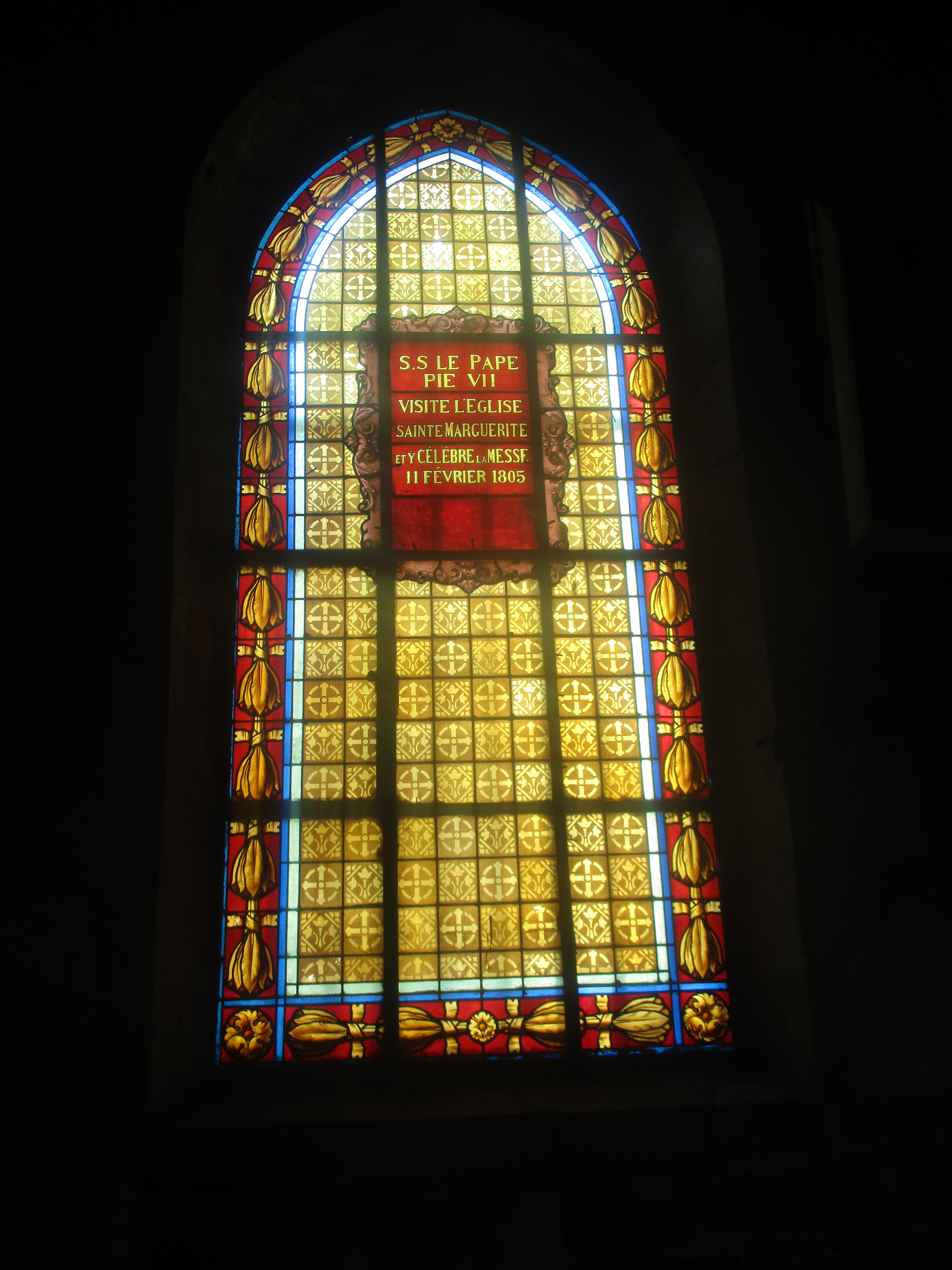
Window celebrating visit of Pope Pius VII to the church in 1805

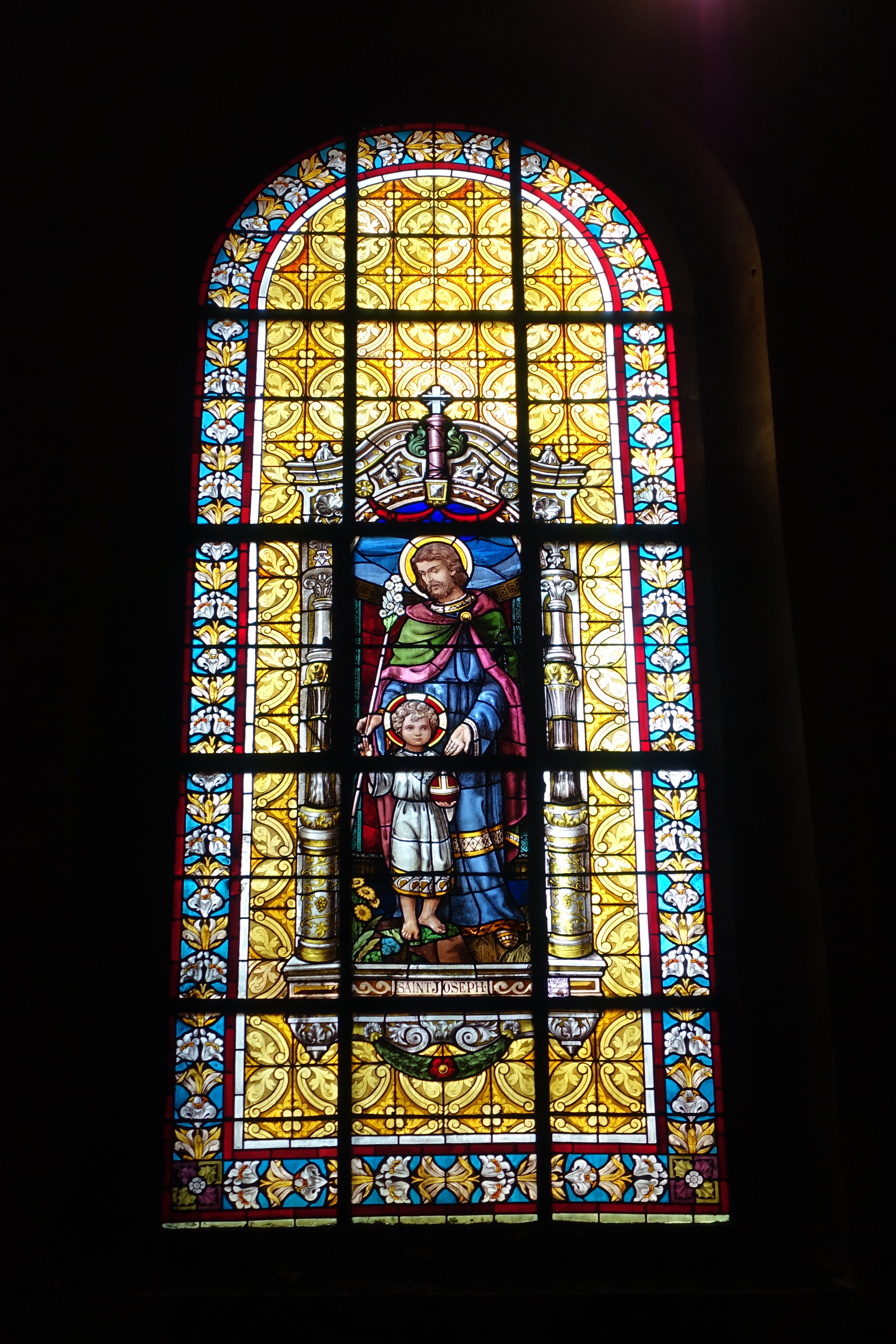
Saint Joseph Window

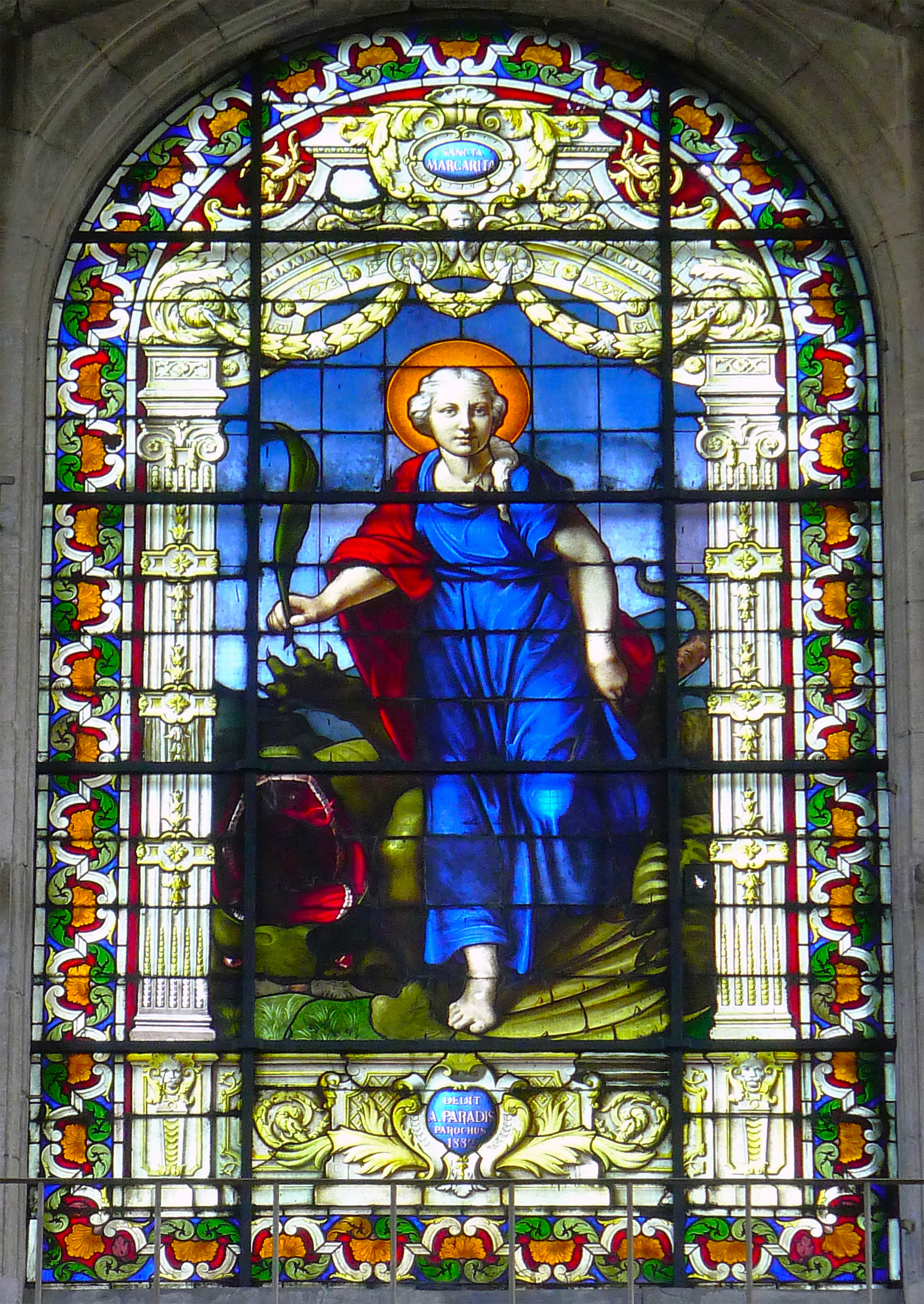
Saint Marguerite window (1882)

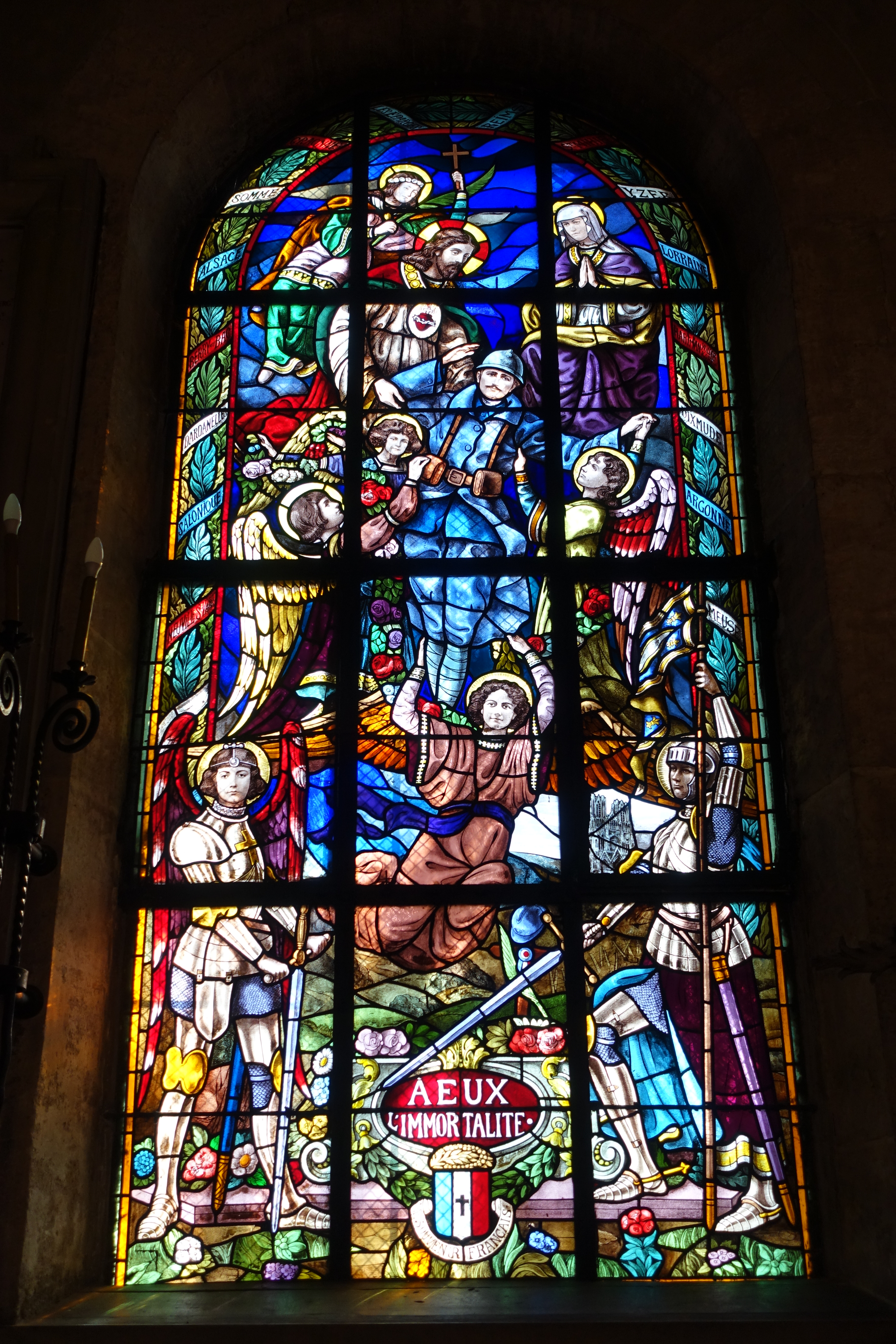
A 20th-century window depicting warriors from history and the First World War

The stained glass windows in the church date mostly from the 19th century or later; the original windows were destroyed during the French Revolution. One window commemorates the visit to the church of Pope Pius VII in 1805, shortly after the building was formally returned to the Catholic Church. Another windows commemorate the death of Monseigneur Affré, killed during the fighting at the barricades in the Faubourg Saint-Antoine during the French Revolution of 1848.

== Bibliography (in French) ==
- Dumoulin, Aline; Ardisson, Alexandra; Maingard, Jérôme; Antonello, Murielle; Églises de Paris (2010), Éditions Massin, Issy-Les-Moulineaux, ISBN 978-2-7072-0683-1

== See also ==
- List of historic churches in Paris
