= Pierre-Antoine Demoustier =

Pierre-Antoine Demoustier (1 August 1735 – 1803) was a French engineer.

== Life ==
Born at Lassigny, he joined the Ecole des ponts et chaussées in 1756 and then had a career from 1763 until the French Consulate. He built pont Louis XV (now known as pont de la Concorde) and was made chief engineer for the Seine department by Napoleon Bonaparte to plan and supervise the construction of pont des Arts and other new bridges in Paris. His pupil Corneille Lamandé published a detailed obituary after his death in 1803. His nephew was Charles-Albert Demoustier.
