= Lanterne =

Lanterne may refer to:

- Lanterne (pasta), a type of pasta
- Lanterne (poem), a form of poetry
- Lanterne (river), in eastern France
