= Second Empire style =

Eclectic architectural and decorative arts style of the Second French Empire

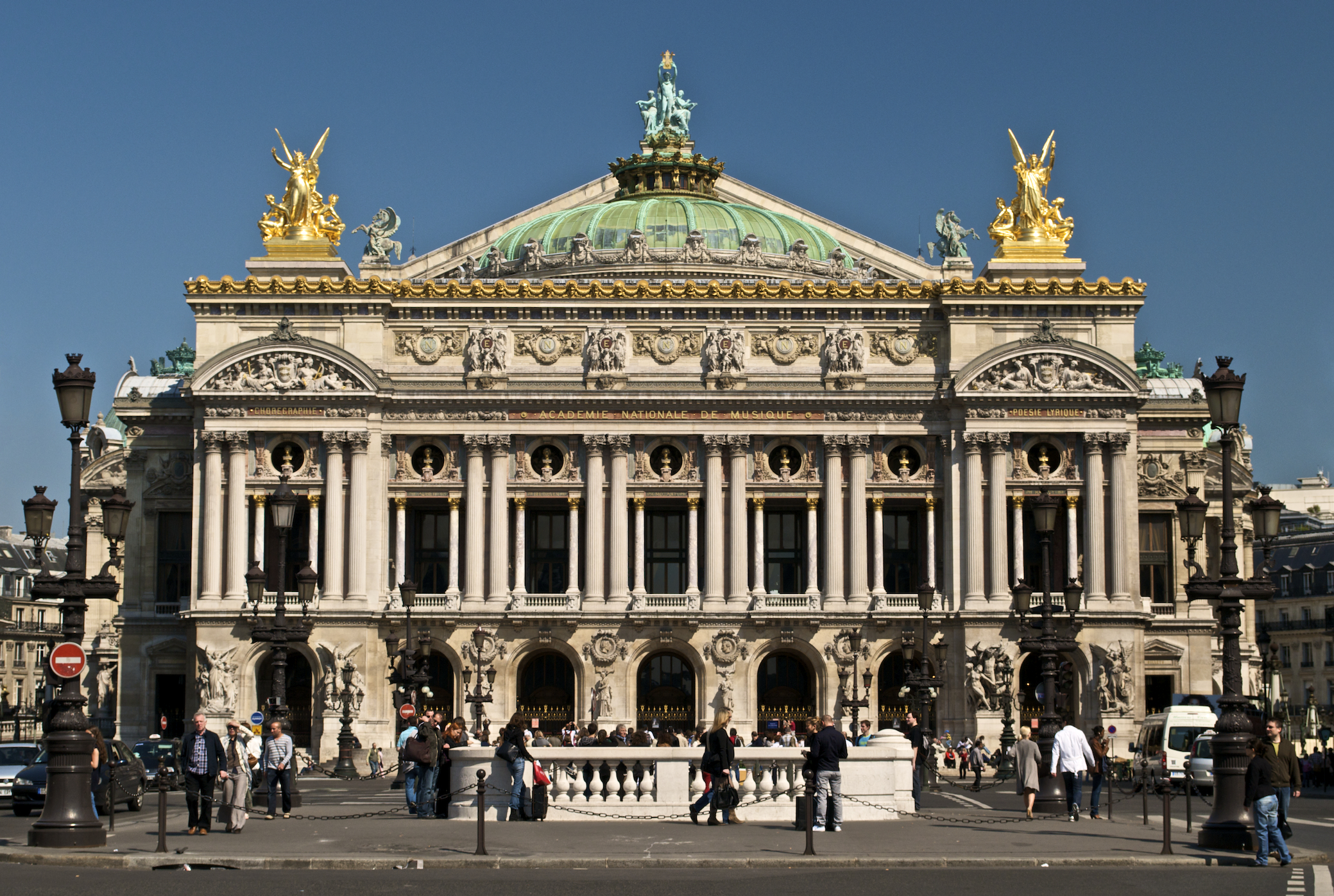
The Opéra Garnier (1862–1875)

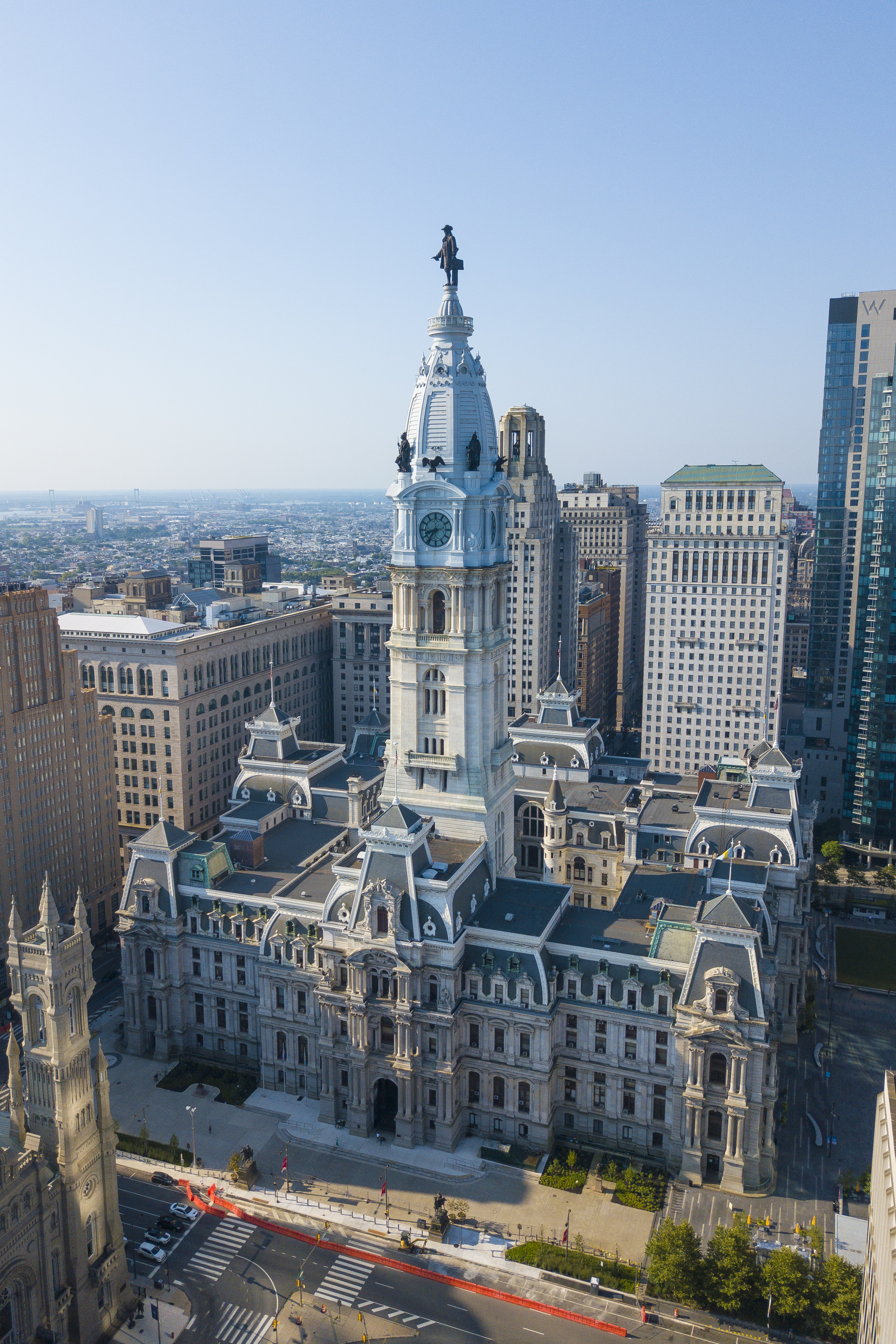
Philadelphia City Hall (1871–1901)

Second Empire style, also known as the Napoleon III style or Haussmann style, is a highly eclectic style of architecture and decorative arts originating in the Second French Empire. It was characterised by elements drawn from many different historical styles, and also made innovative use of modern materials such as iron frameworks and glass skylights. It flourished during the reign of Emperor Napoleon III (1852–1870) and had an important influence on architecture and decoration across the rest of Europe and North America. Major examples of the style include the Opéra Garnier (1862–1875) in Paris by Charles Garnier, the Institut National d'Histoire de l'Art, the Church of Saint Augustine (1860–1871), and the Philadelphia City Hall (1871–1901). The architectural style was closely connected with Haussmann's renovation of Paris carried out during the Second Empire; the new buildings, such as the Opéra, were intended as the focal points of the new boulevards.

== Characteristics ==
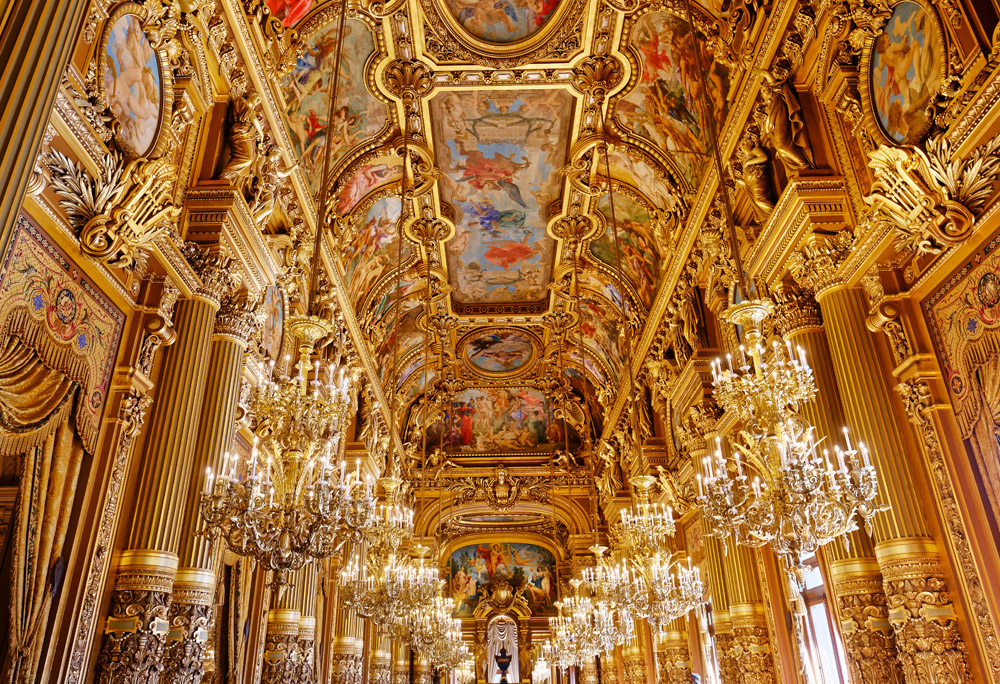
The ceiling of the Grand Salon of the Opéra Garnier (1862–1875)

The Napoleon III or Second Empire style drew its inspiration from several different periods and styles, which were often combined within the same building or interior. The interior of the Opéra Garnier by Charles Garnier combined architectural elements of the French Renaissance, Palladian architecture, and French Baroque, while achieving coherence and harmony throughout. The Lions Gate of the Louvre Palace by Hector Lefuel is a Louis-Napoléon interpretation of French Renaissance architecture; few visitors to the Louvre realise it is a 19th-century addition to the building.

Another characteristic of the Napoleon III style is the adaptation of building design to its function and to the properties of the materials used. Examples include the Gare du Nord railway station by Jacques Ignace Hittorff, the Church of Saint Augustine by Victor Baltard, and particularly the iron-framed structures of the market of Les Halles and the reading room of the Bibliothèque nationale in Paris, both also by Victor Baltard.

A basic principle of Napoleon III interior decoration was to leave no surface undecorated. Another principle was polychromy — an abundance of colour achieved through coloured marble, malachite, onyx, porphyry, mosaics, and silver- or gold-plated bronze. Wood panelling was often encrusted with rare and exotic woods, or darkened to resemble ebony. The façade of the Opéra Garnier employed seventeen different coloured materials, including various marbles, stones, and bronze.

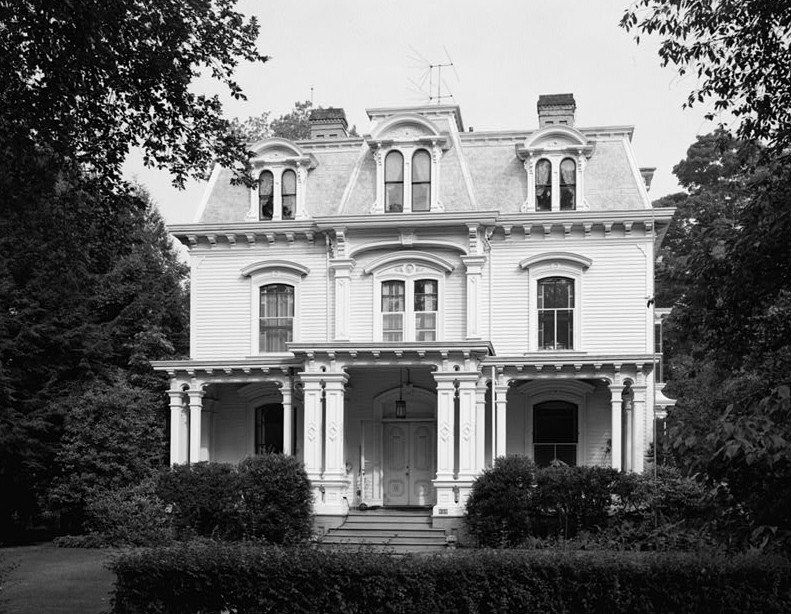
Mrs. Benjamin Pomeroy House (1868), Bunnell and Lambert, Southport, Connecticut

== Architecture ==
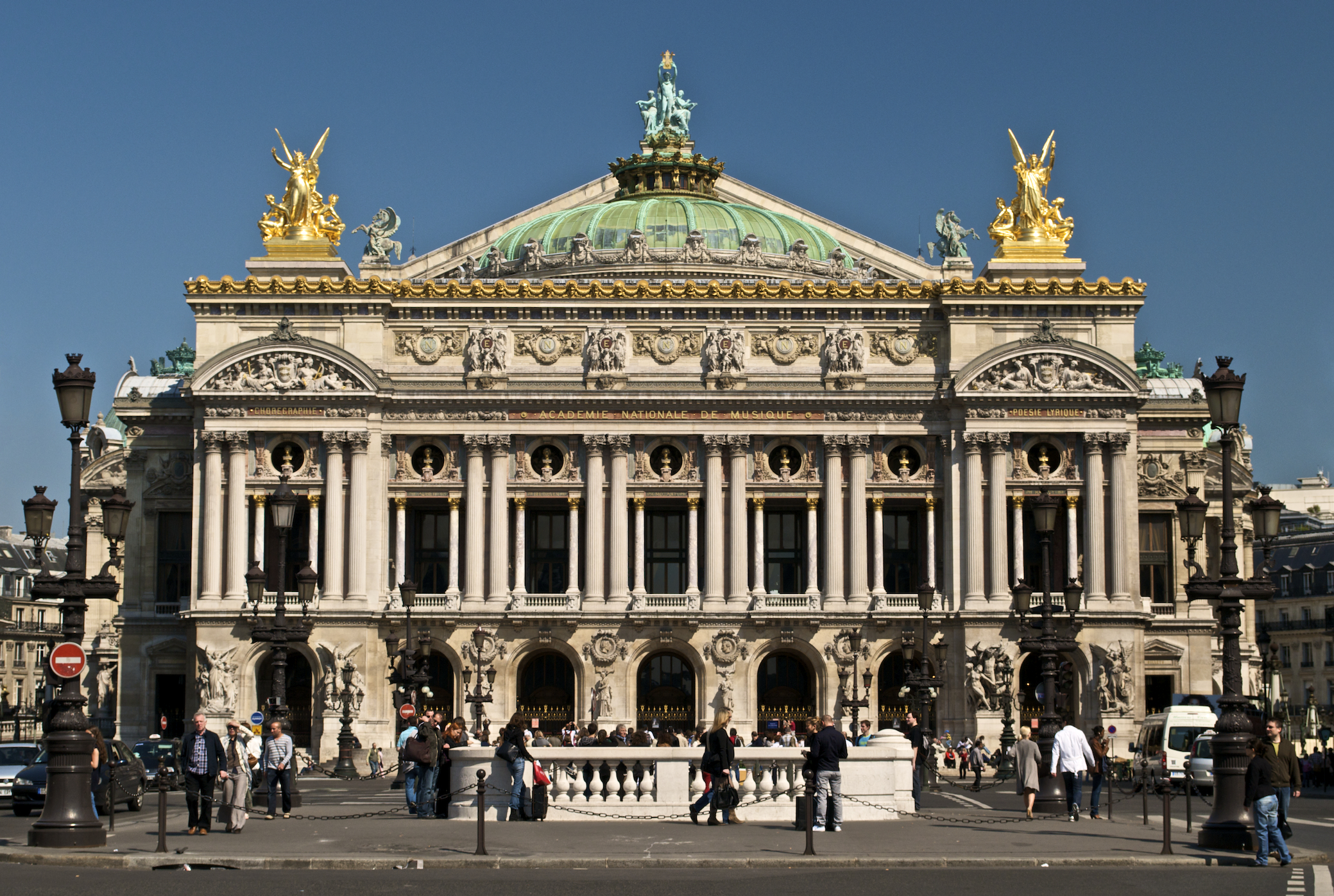
The Palais Garnier in Paris

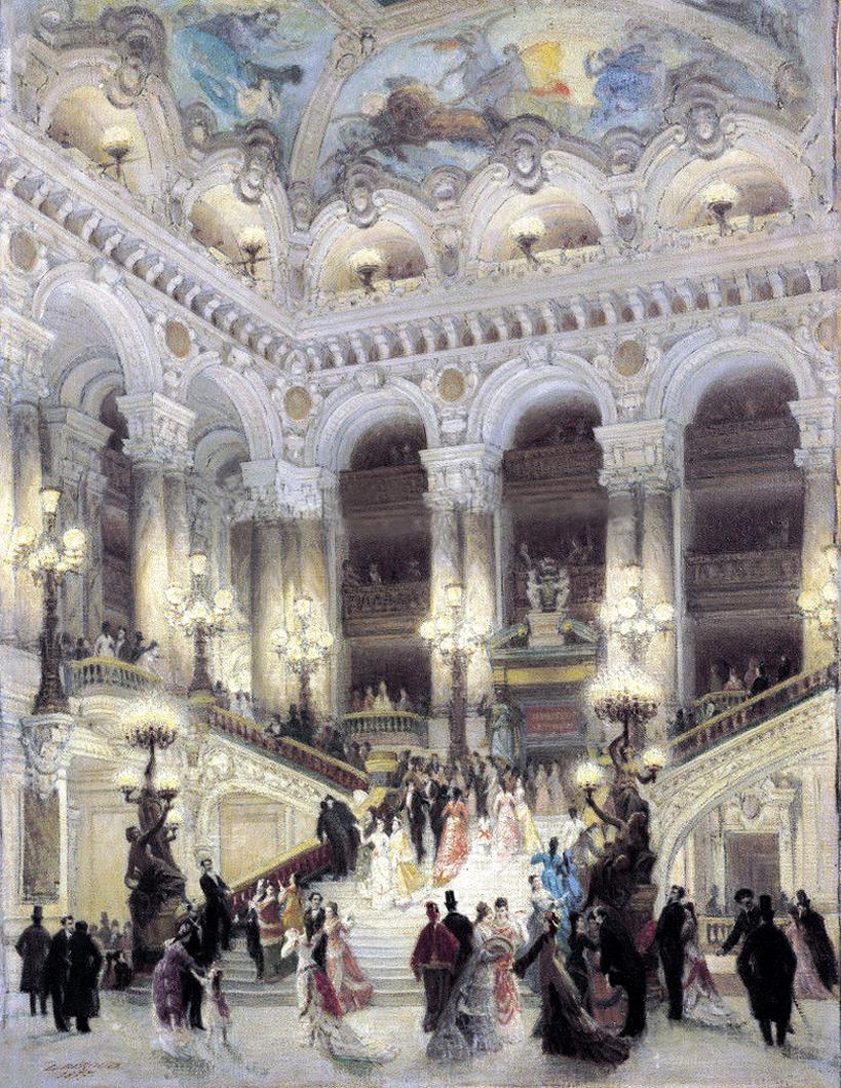
The grand stairway of the Paris Opera, designed by Charles Garnier, in the style he called simply "Napoleon III"

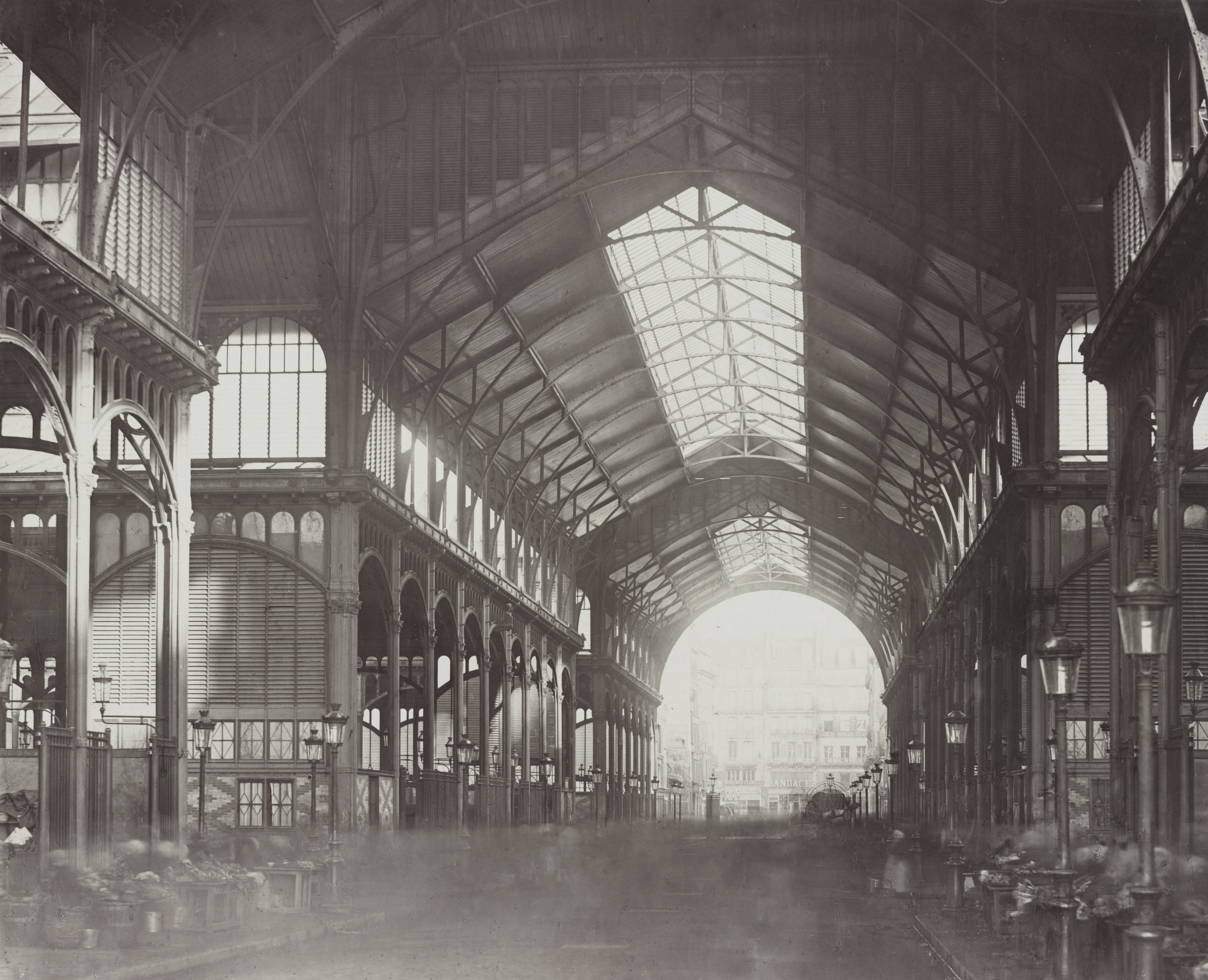
The interior of one of the giant glass and iron pavilions of Les Halles designed by Victor Baltard (1853–1870)

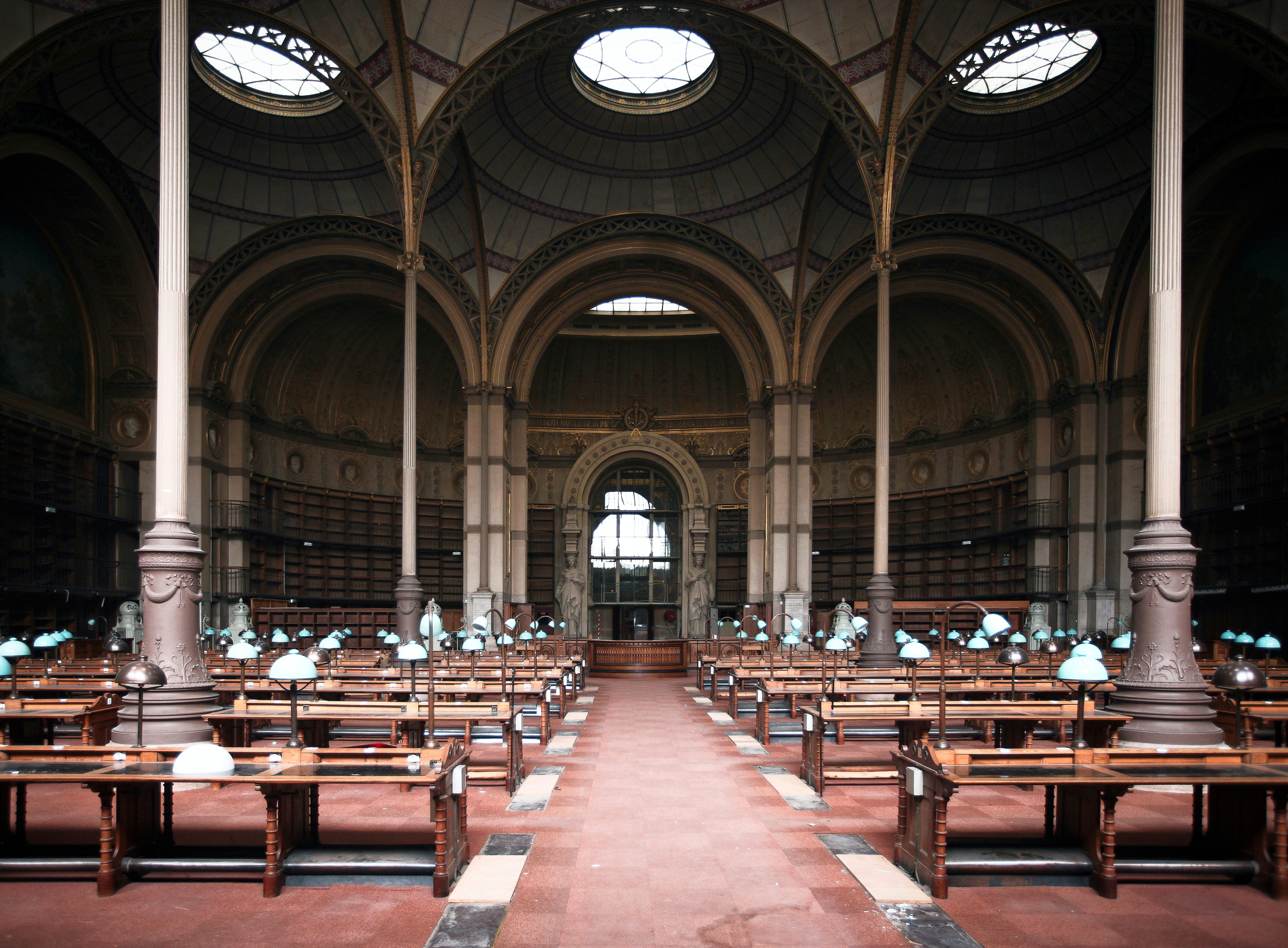
The reading room of the Institut National d'Histoire de l'Art, Richelieu site (1854–1875), designed by Henri Labrouste

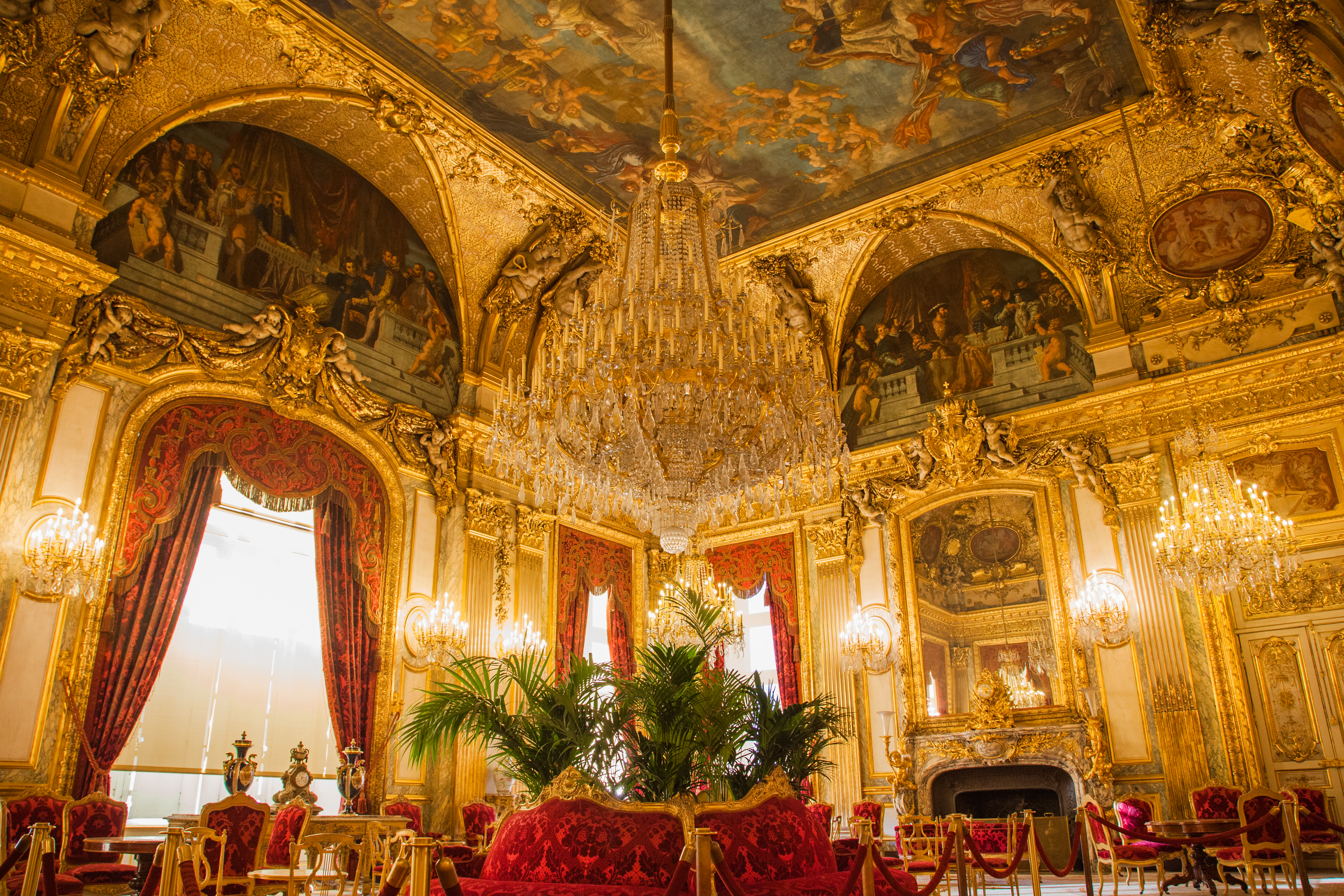
The Grand Salon of the apartments of the minister of state, currently known as the Napoleon III Apartments, in the Louvre Palace, Paris (1859–1860), designed by Hector Lefuel and decorated with paintings by Charles-Raphaël Maréchal

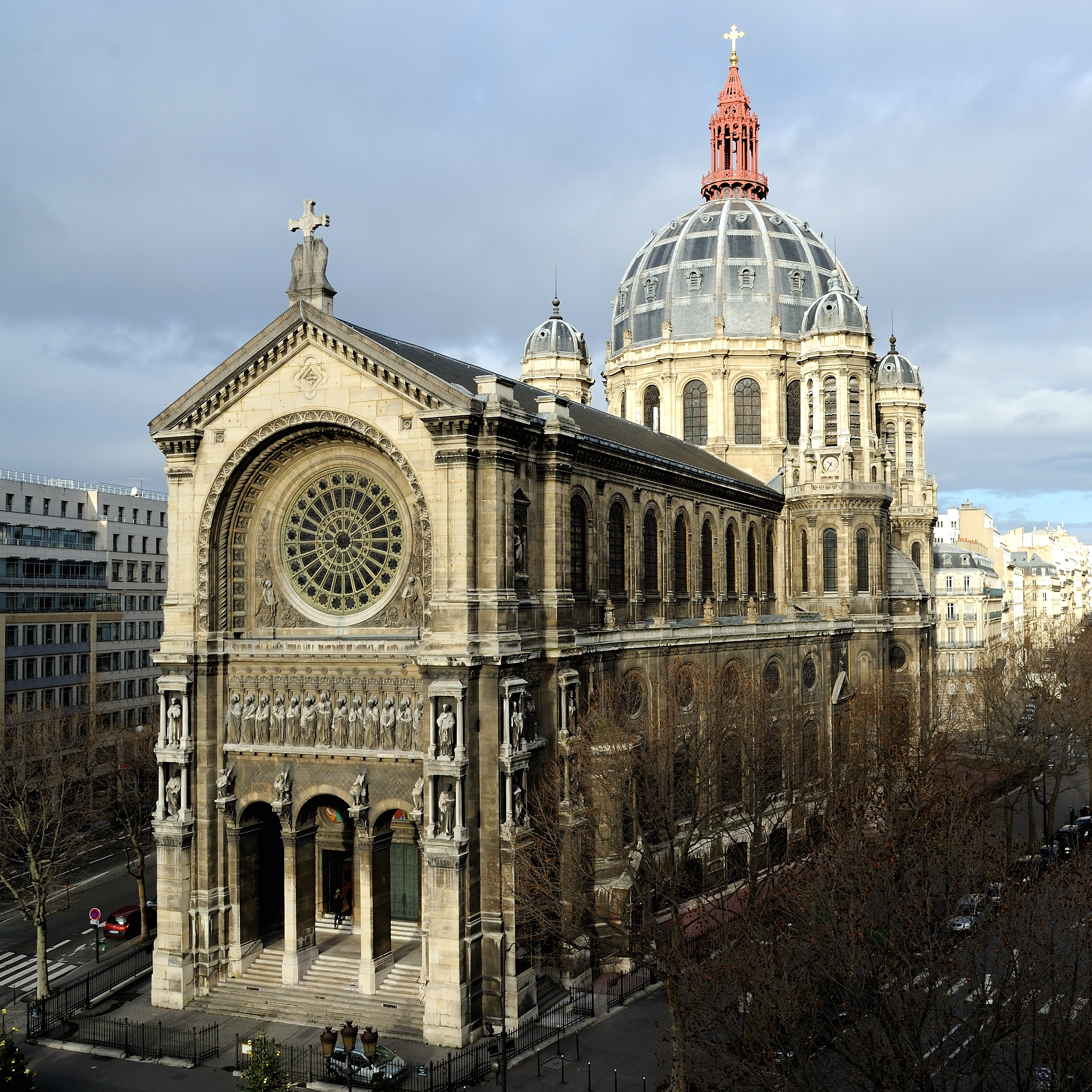
The Church of Saint Augustine (1860–1871), designed by architect Victor Baltard, had a revolutionary iron frame, but an eclectic Neo-Renaissance exterior

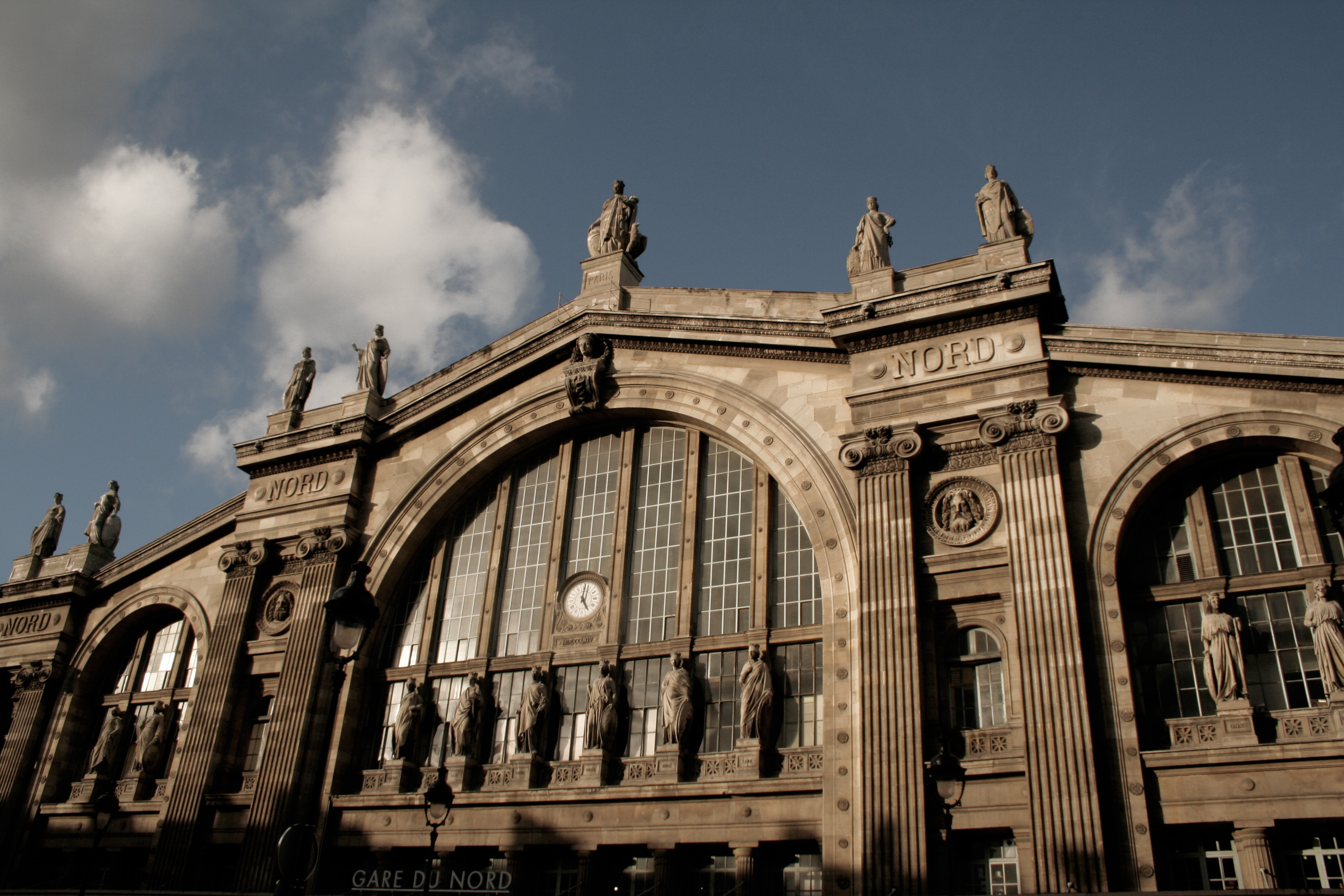
The Gare du Nord, designed to be one of the new gateways to Paris, with an iron framework combined with allegorical statues of French cities

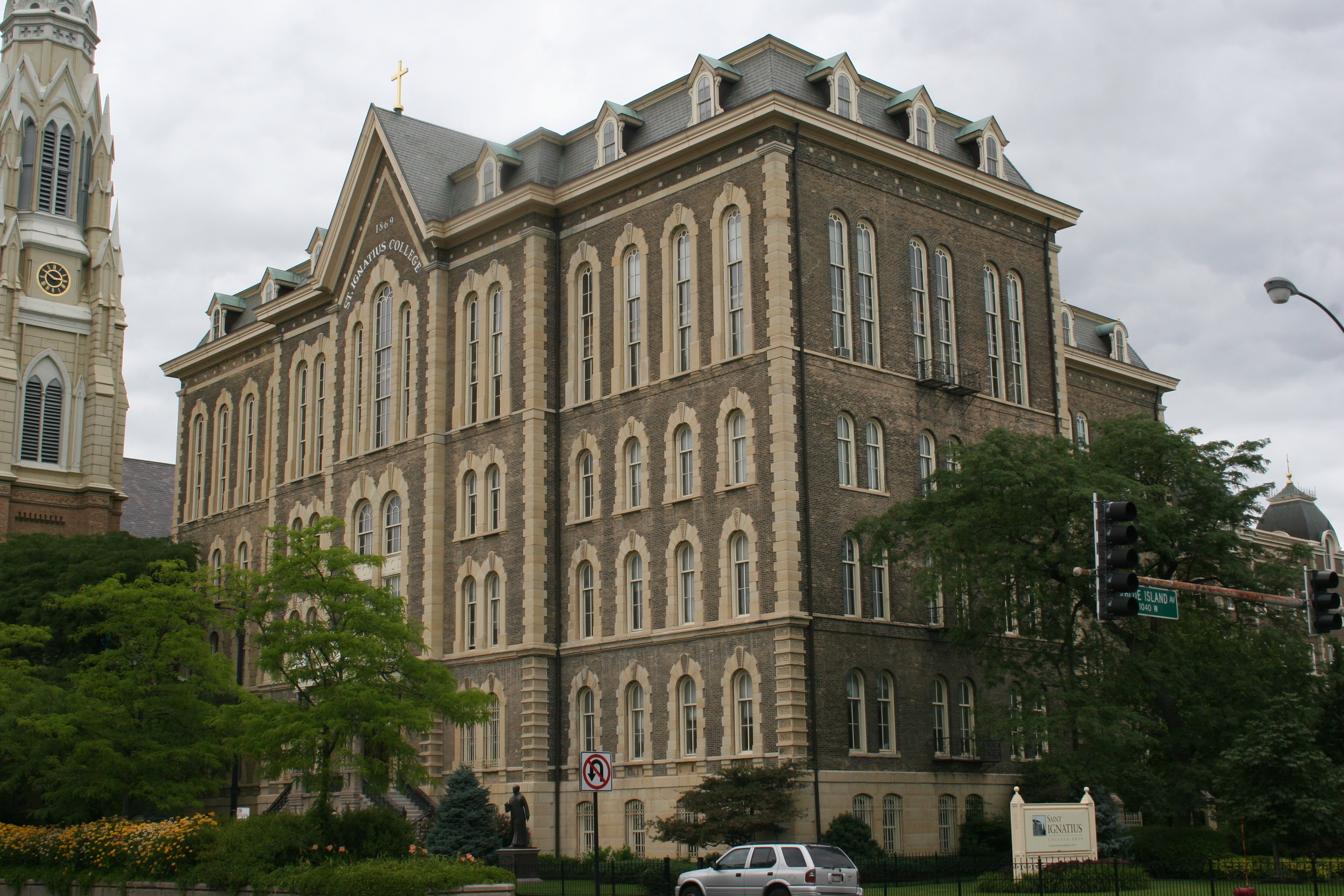
The main building of St. Ignatius College Prep in Chicago, Illinois, designed by Canadian architect Toussaint Menard, is a classic example of the style. It is one of the five extant public buildings in Chicago that predate the Great Chicago Fire of 1871.

Second Empire is an architectural style that was most popular in the latter half of the 19th century and the early years of the 20th century. It takes its name from the architectural elements in vogue during the era of the Second French Empire. As the Second Empire style evolved from its 17th-century Renaissance foundations, it acquired a blend of earlier European styles, most notably the Baroque, often combined with mansard roofs and low, square-based domes.

The style spread rapidly and evolved as Baroque Revival architecture throughout Europe and across the Atlantic. Its suitability for large-scale application made it widely used in the design of municipal and corporate buildings. In the United States, where one of the leading architects working in the style was Alfred B. Mullett, buildings in the style were often closer to their 17th-century roots than European examples.

The dominant architectural tendency of the Second Empire was eclecticism, drawing liberally from the Gothic style, Renaissance style, and the styles dominant during the reigns of Louis XV and Louis XVI. The combination was derided by Émile Zola as "the opulent bastard child of all the styles". The finest example was the Opéra Garnier, begun in 1862 but not completed until 1875. The architect was Charles Garnier (1825–1898), who won the competition for the design at the age of thirty-seven. When the Empress Eugénie asked Garnier what the style of the building was called, he replied simply: "Napoleon III." At the time it was the largest opera house in the world, but much of the interior space was devoted to purely decorative purposes: grand stairways, vast foyers for promenading, and large private boxes. Another example was the Mairie, or city hall, of the 1st arrondissement of Paris, built in 1855–1861 in a neo-Gothic style by the architect Jacques Ignace Hittorff (1792–1867).

The Industrial Revolution was beginning to demand a new kind of architecture: bigger, stronger, and less expensive. The new age of railways and the enormous increase in travel it brought required new train stations, large hotels, exposition halls, and department stores in Paris. While the exteriors of most Second Empire monumental buildings usually remained eclectic, a revolution was taking place inside; following the model of The Crystal Palace in London (1851), Parisian architects began to use cast iron frames and walls of glass in their buildings.

The most dramatic use of iron and glass was in the new central market of Paris, Les Halles (1853–1870), an ensemble of huge iron and glass pavilions designed by Victor Baltard (1805–1874) and Félix Callet (1792–1854). Jacques Ignace Hittorff also made extensive use of iron and glass in the interior of the new Gare du Nord train station (1842–1865), though the façade was purely neoclassical, decorated with classical statues representing the cities served by the railway. Baltard also used a steel frame in constructing the largest new church built in Paris during the Empire, the Church of Saint Augustine (1860–1871). While the structure was supported by cast iron columns, the façade remained eclectic. Henri Labrouste (1801–1875) also used iron and glass to create a dramatic cathedral-like reading room for the National Library, Richelieu site (1854–1875).

The Second Empire also saw the completion or restoration of several architectural treasures: the Nouveau Louvre project realised a longstanding ambition of rationalising the Louvre Palace, the famed stained glass windows and structure of the Sainte-Chapelle were restored by Eugène Viollet-le-Duc, and the Cathedral of Notre-Dame underwent extensive restoration. In the case of the Louvre in particular, the restorations were sometimes more imaginative than precisely historical.

=== Religious architecture ===
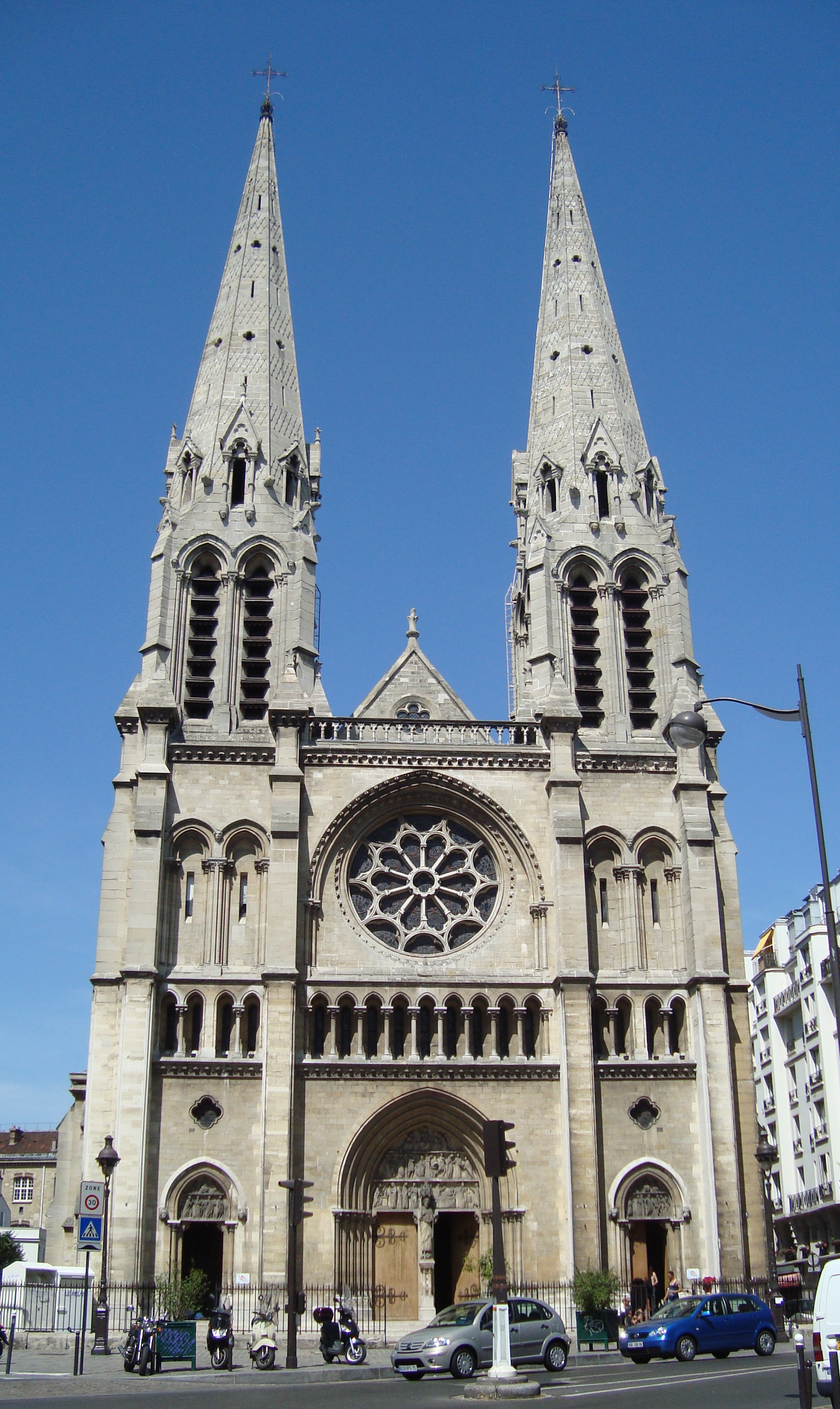
Church of Saint-Jean-Baptiste de Belleville in the neo-Gothic style by Jean-Baptiste Lassus (1854–59)

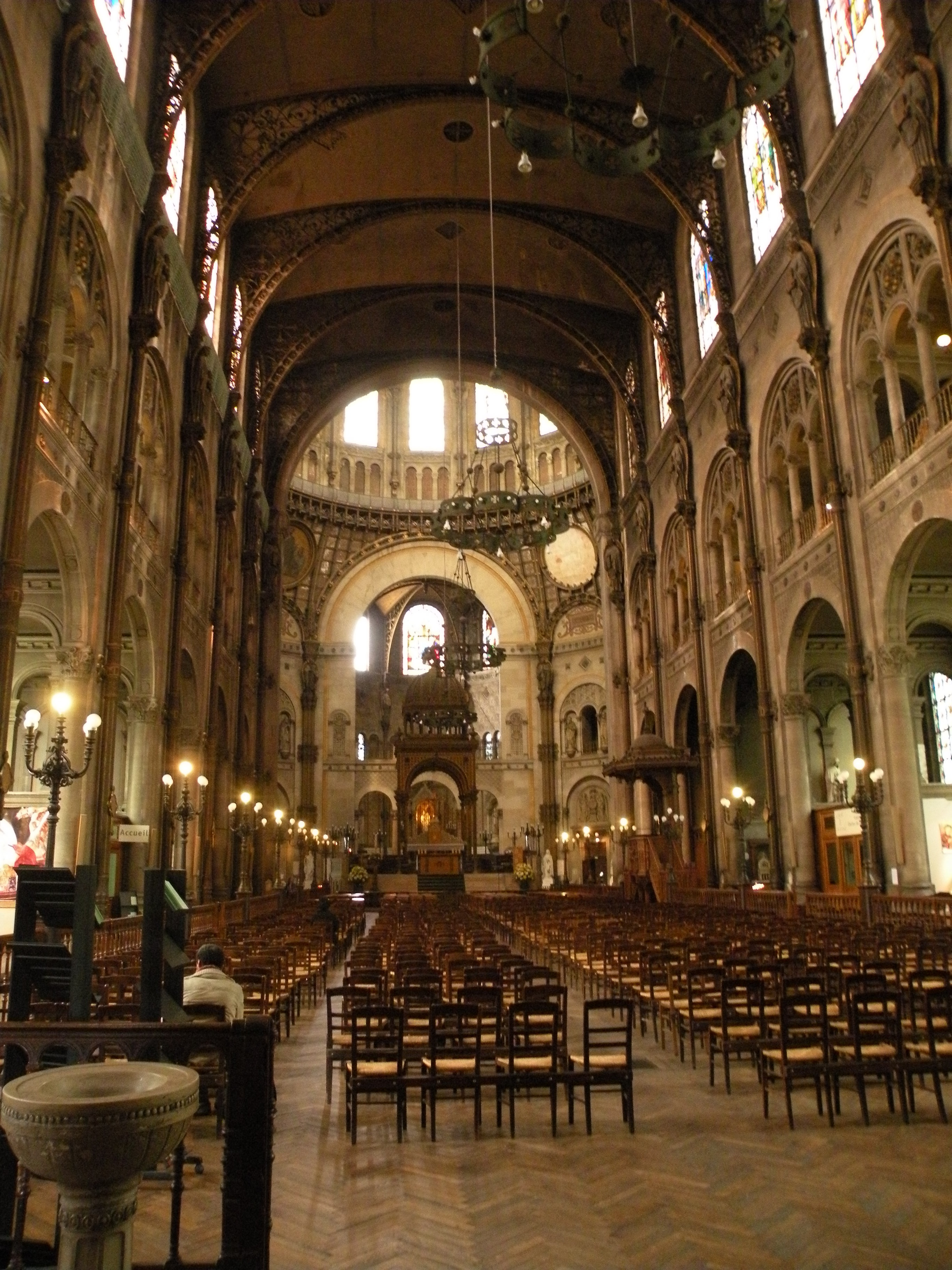
Interior of Saint-Augustin, with the roof supported by slender iron columns (1860–71)

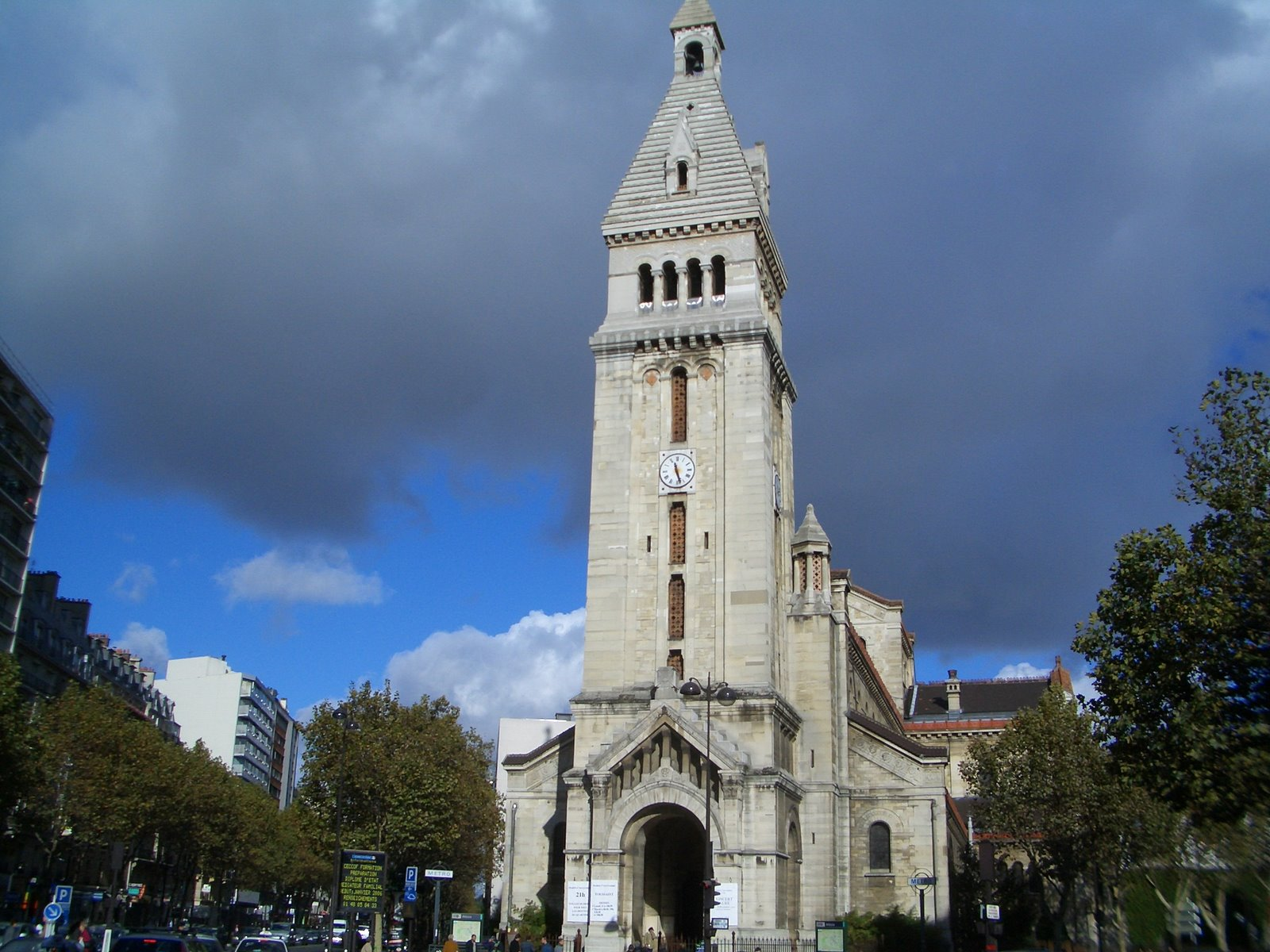
Church of Saint-Pierre-de-Montrouge (14th arrondissement) by Joseph Auguste Émile Vaudremer (1863–70)

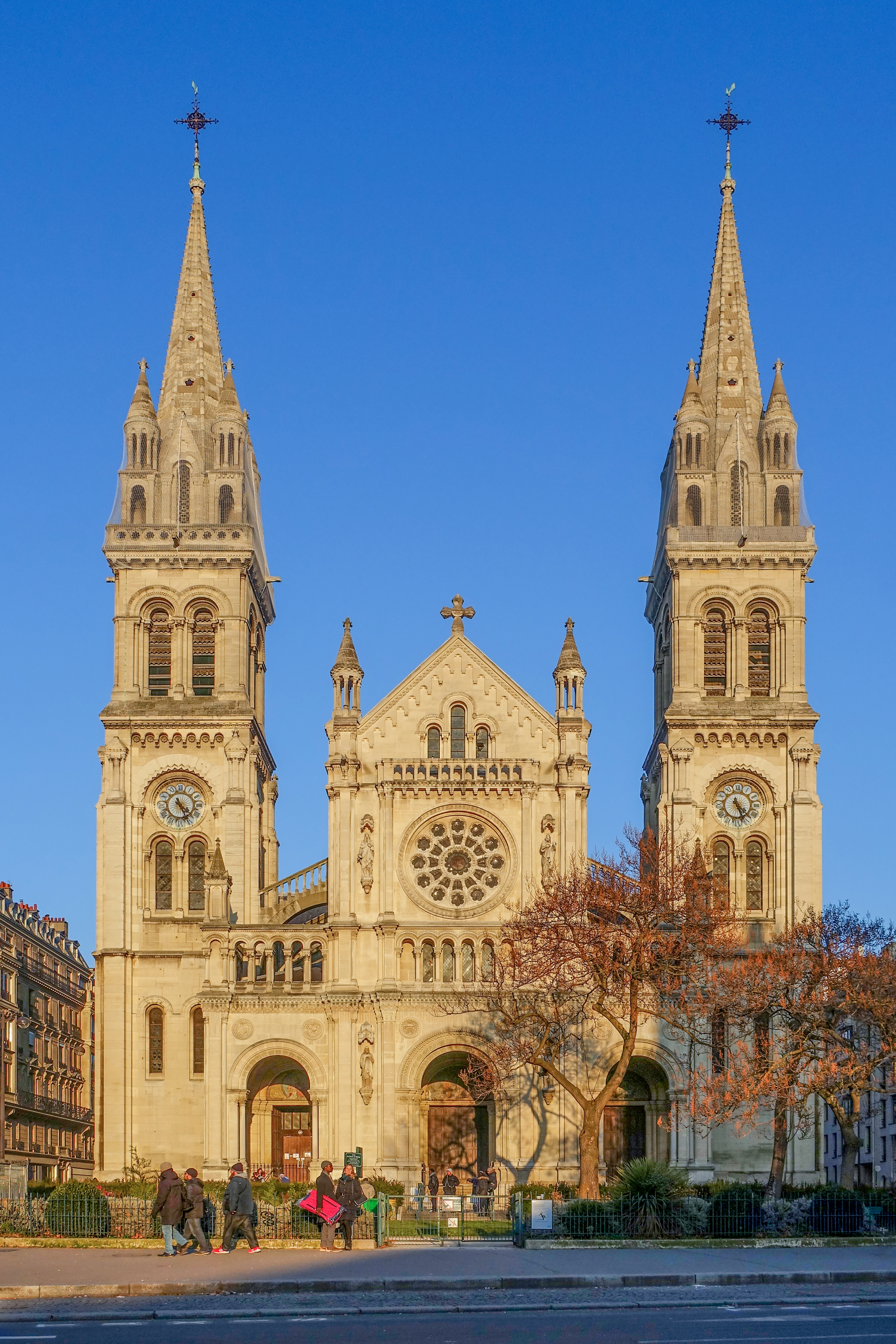
Church of Saint-Ambroise (11th arrondissement) by Théodore Ballu (1863–68)

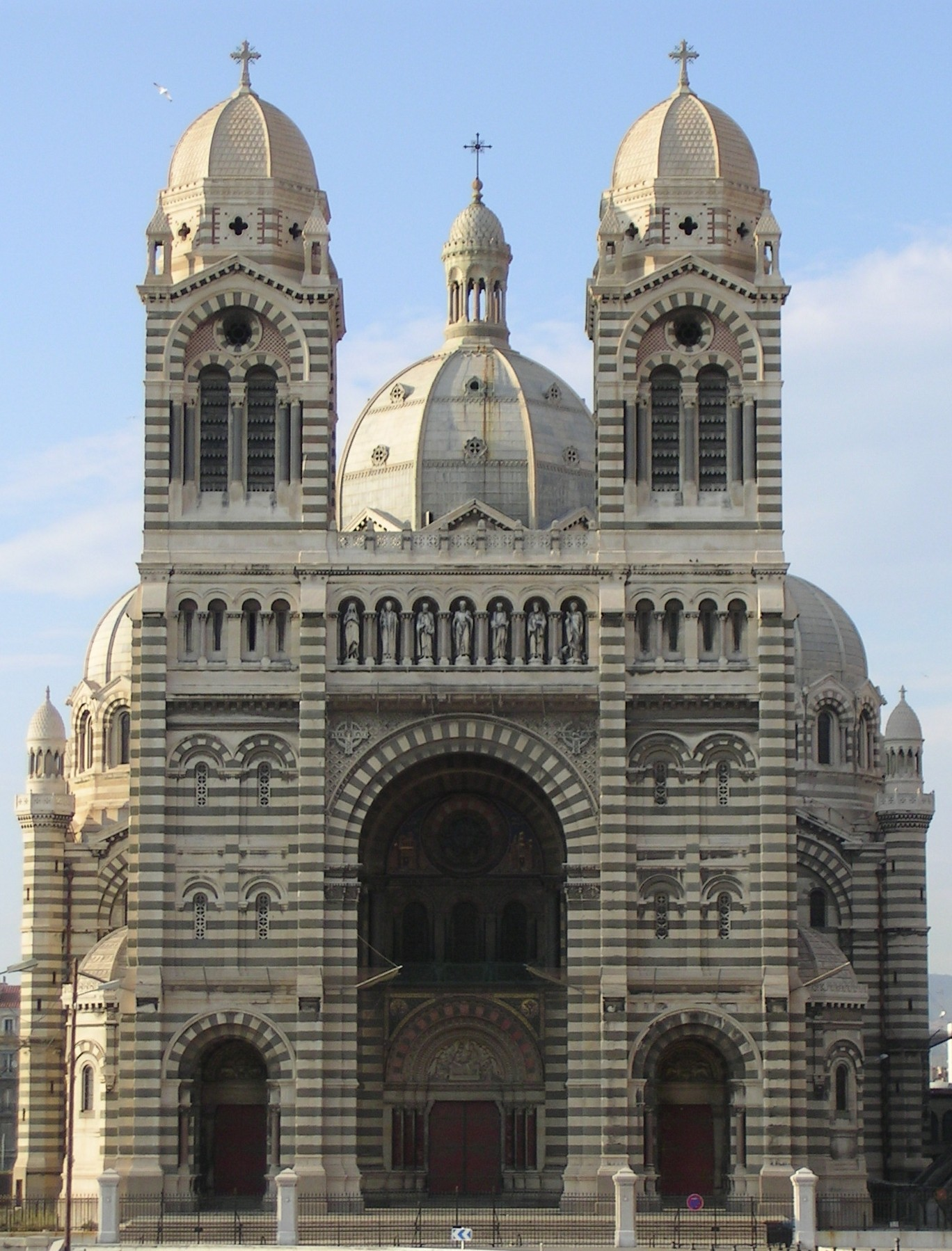
Marseille Cathedral by Léon Vaudoyer and Henri-Jacques Espérandieu (1852–96)

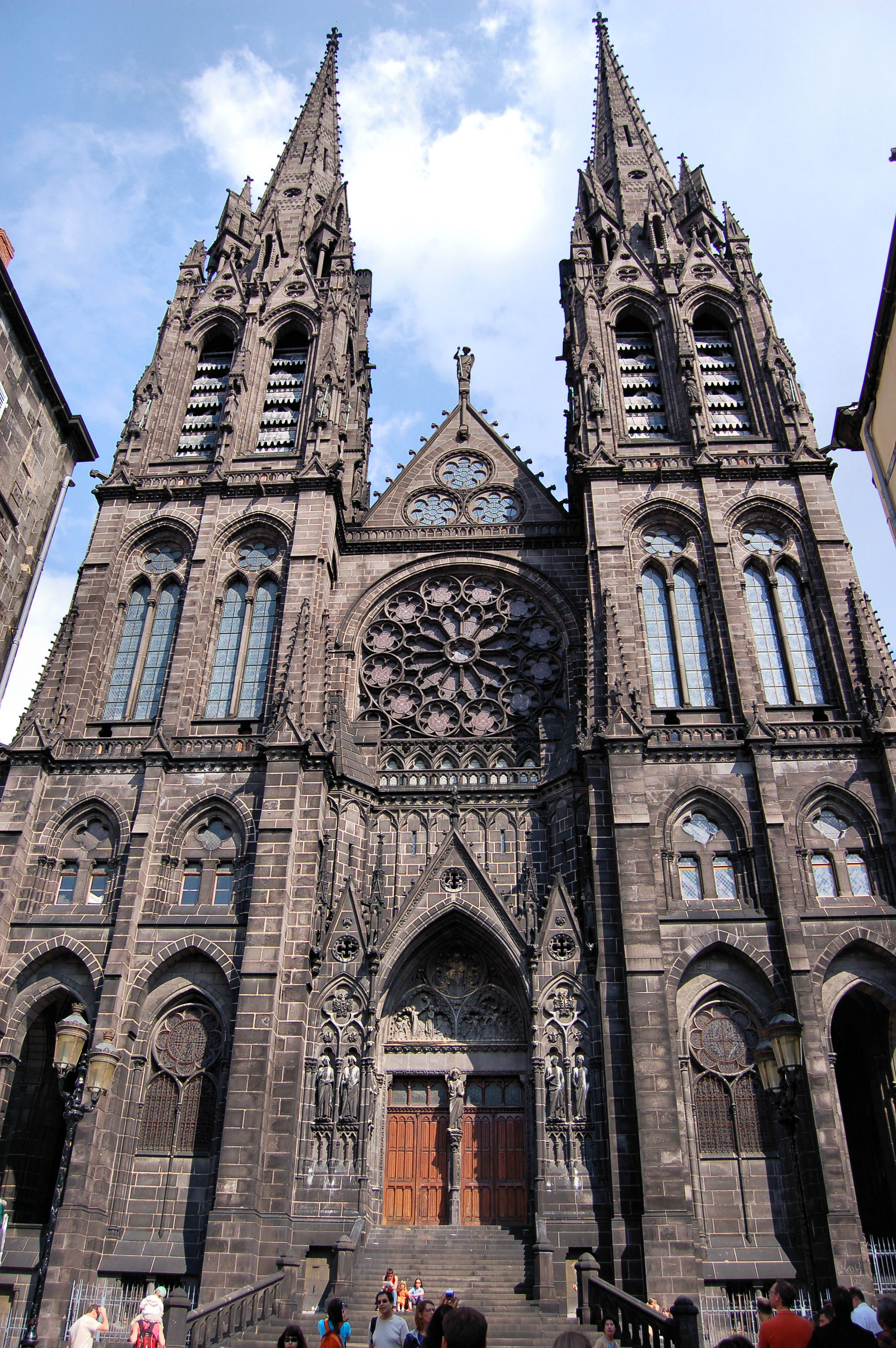
West façade of the Cathedral of Clermont-Ferrand by Eugène Viollet-le-Duc (1866–84)

During the Second Empire, under the influence particularly of the architect and historian Eugène Viollet-le-Duc, French religious architecture broke away from the neoclassical style that had dominated Paris church architecture since the 18th century. Neo-Gothic and other historical styles began to appear, particularly in the eight new arrondissements farther from the centre added by Napoleon III in 1860. The first neo-Gothic church was the Basilica of Sainte-Clothilde, begun by Franz Christian Gau in 1841 and completed by Théodore Ballu in 1857.

During the Second Empire, architects began to combine metal frames with the Gothic style: the Église Saint-Laurent, a 15th-century church rebuilt in neo-Gothic style by Simon-Claude-Constant Dufeux (1862–65); Saint-Eugène-Sainte-Cécile by Louis-Auguste Boileau and Louis-Adrien Lusson (1854–55); and Saint-Jean-Baptiste de Belleville by Jean-Baptiste Lassus (1854–59). The largest new church built in Paris during the Second Empire was the Church of Saint Augustine (1860–71) by Victor Baltard, the designer of the metal pavilions of the market of Les Halles. While the façade was eclectic, the interior structure was modern, supported by slender cast iron columns.

Not all churches built under Napoleon III were in the Gothic style. Marseille Cathedral, constructed between 1852 and 1896, was designed in a Byzantine Revival style, principally by Léon Vaudoyer and Henri-Jacques Espérandieu.

=== The Louvre ===
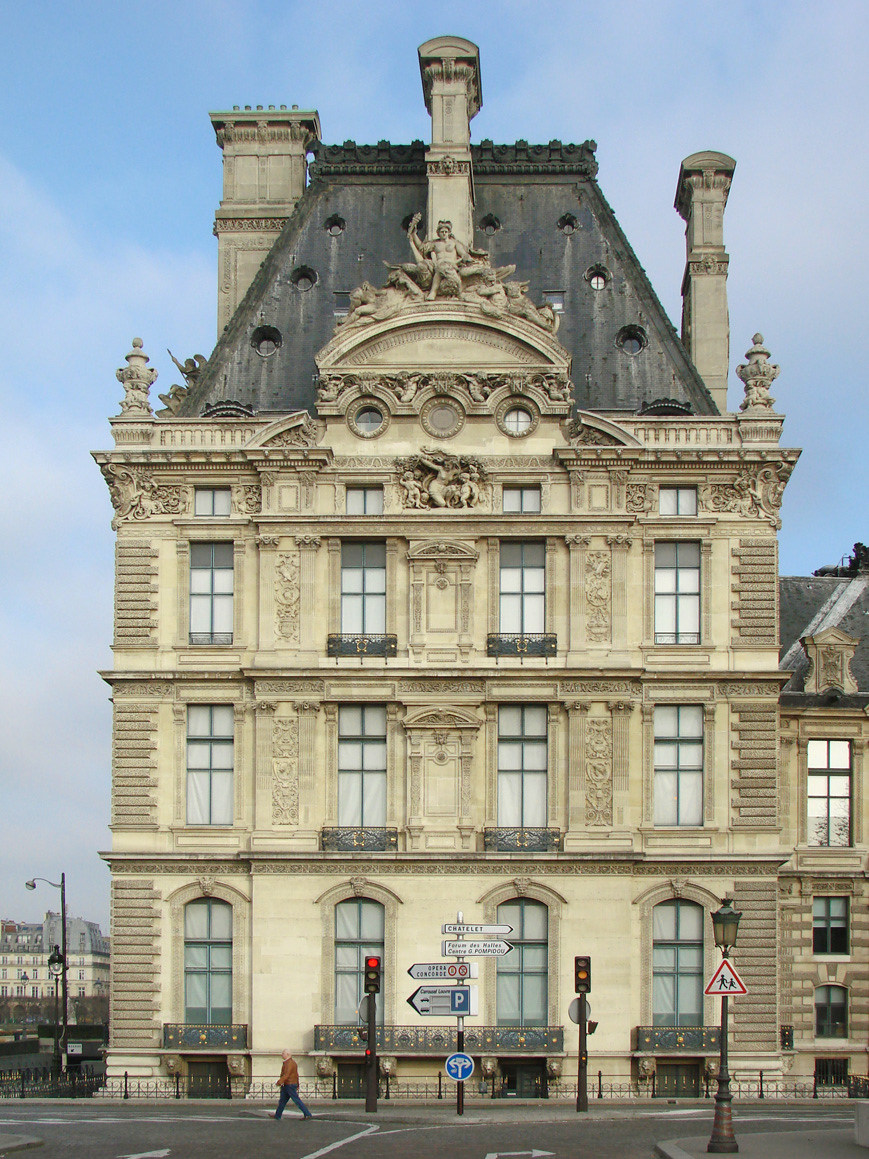
Pavillon de Flore south façade by Hector Lefuel (1864–68)

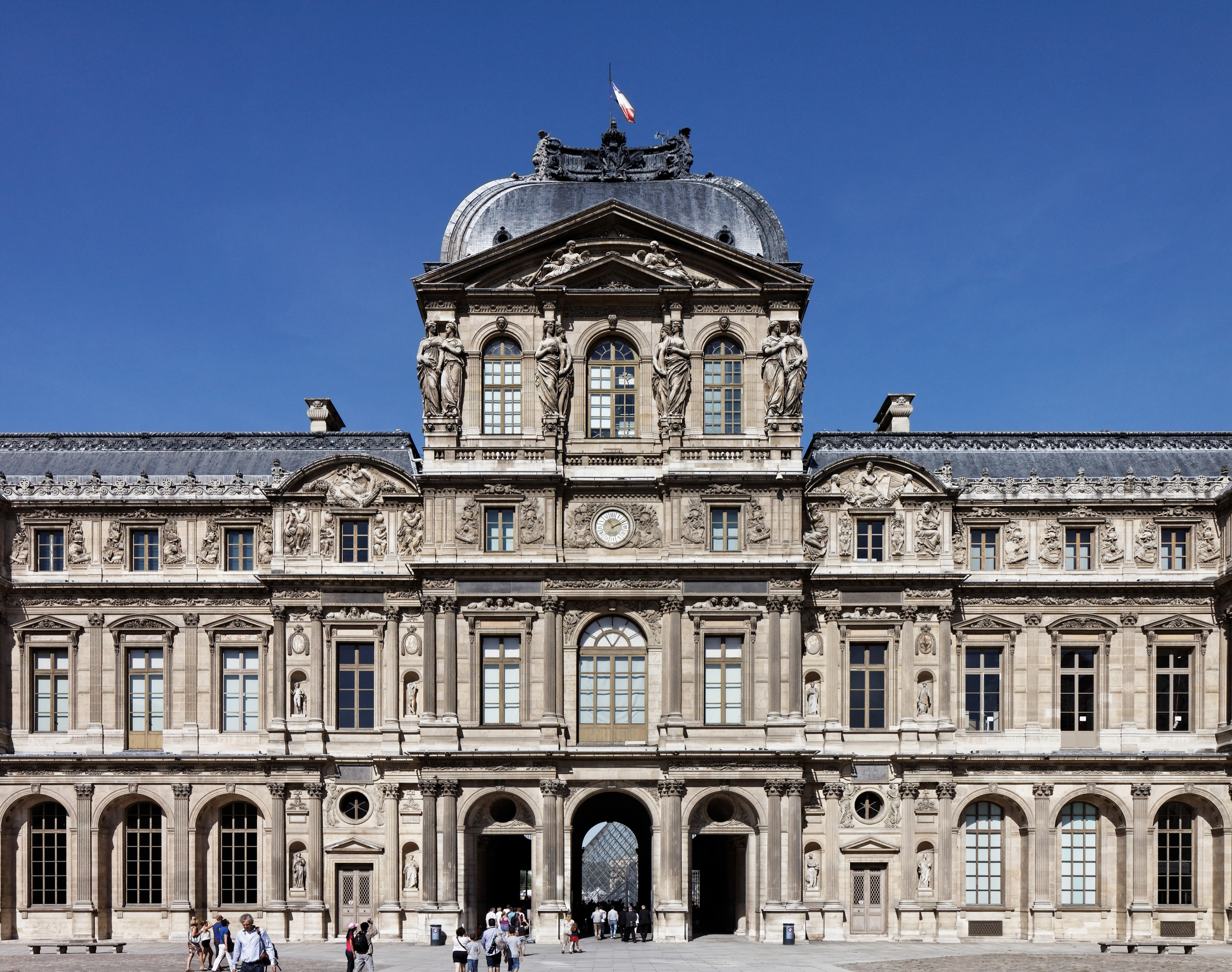
Western façade of Pavillon de l'Horloge of the Louvre by Hector Lefuel

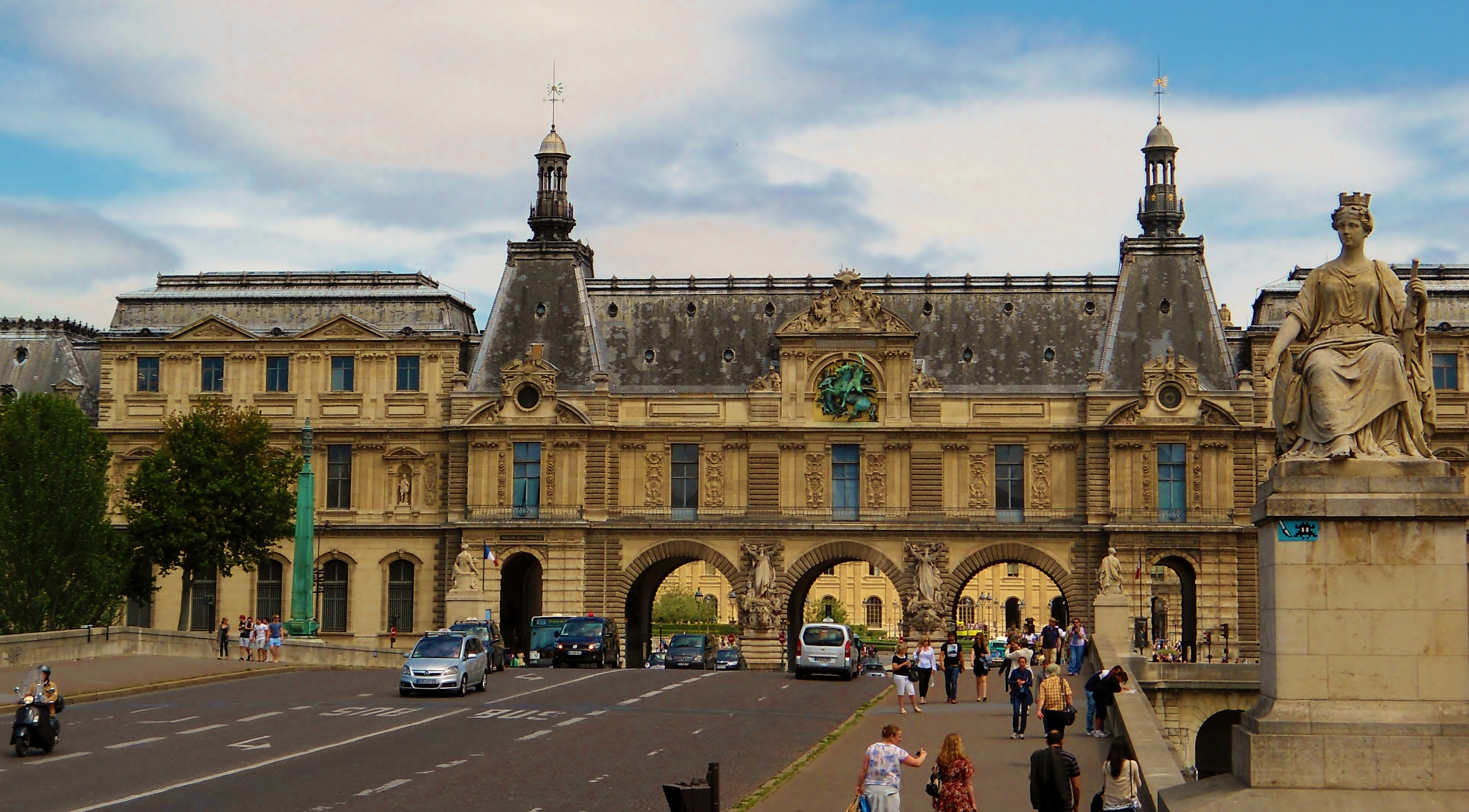
Gates of the Louvre by Hector Lefuel (1861)

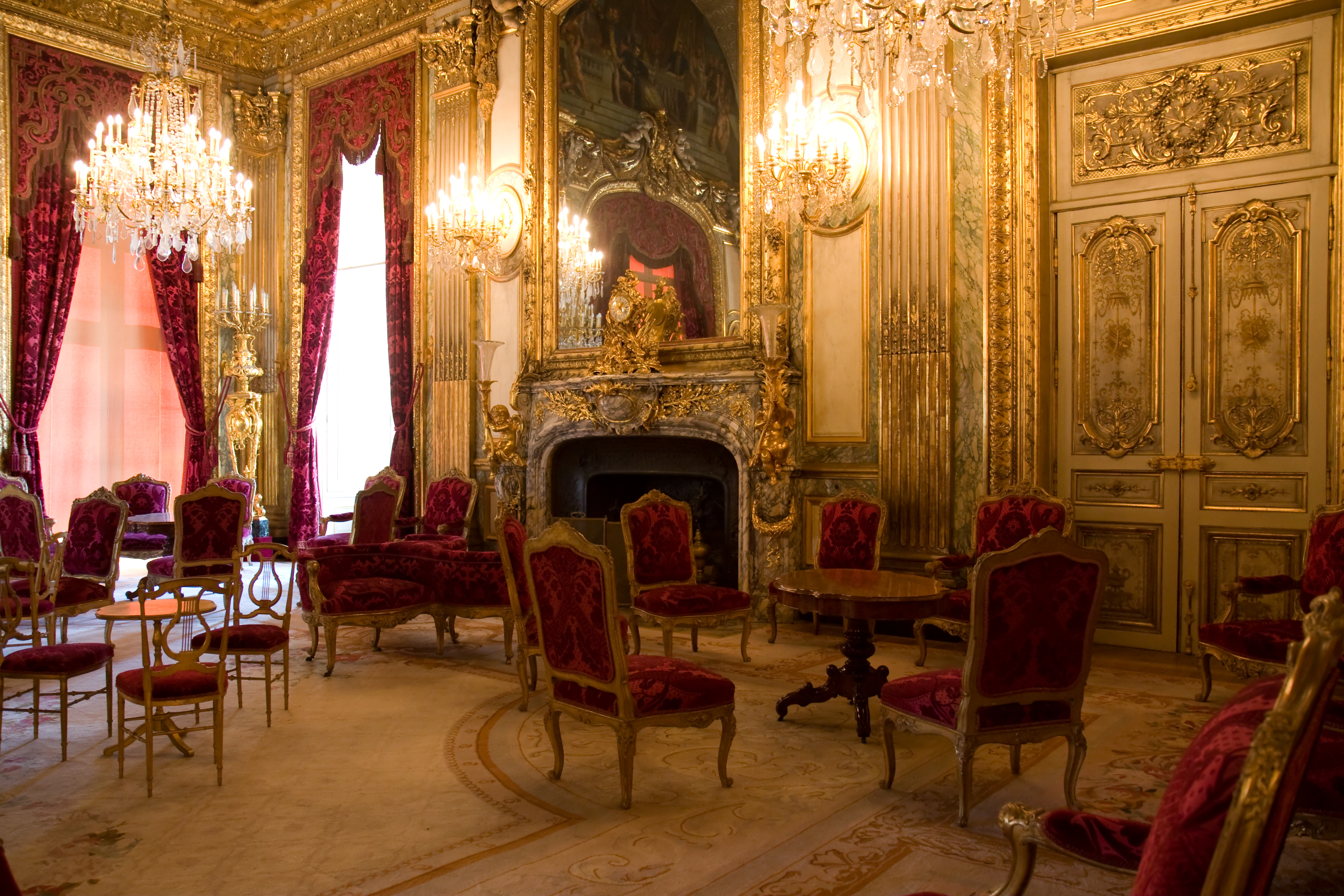
Grand Salon of Napoleon III apartments in the Louvre

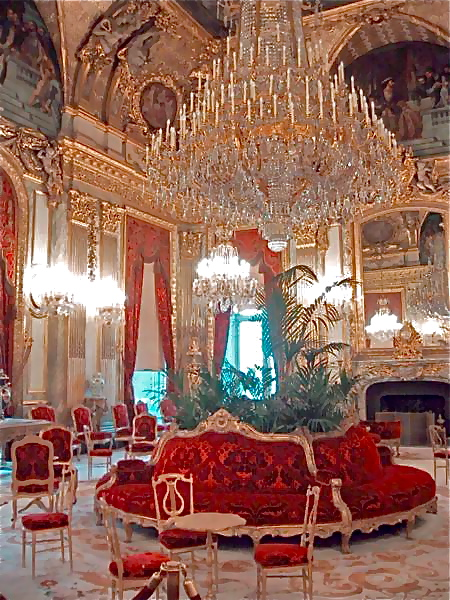
Grand Salon of Napoleon III in the Louvre

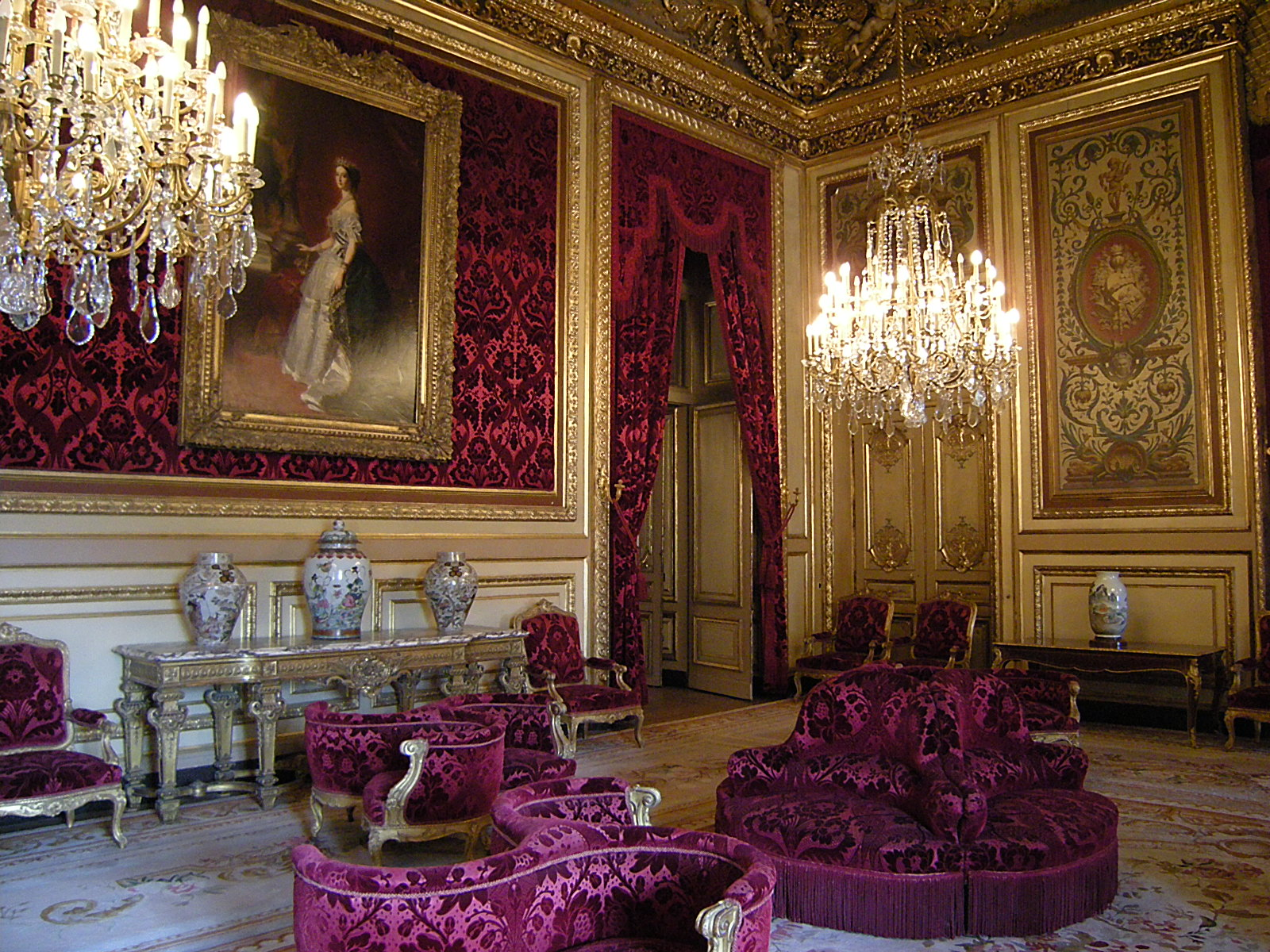
Louvre Salon from Napoleon III suite

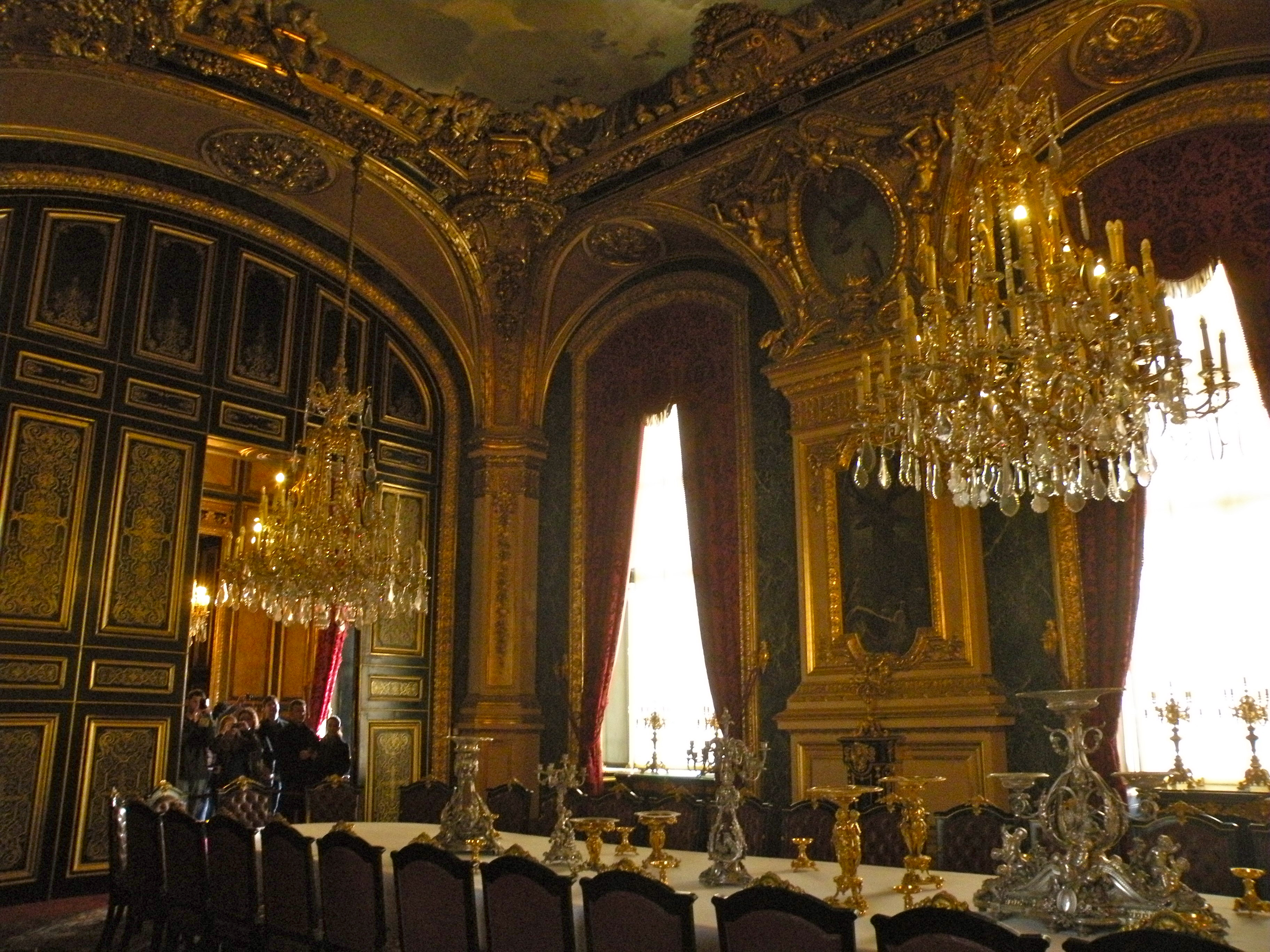
Dining room of Napoleon III apartments at Louvre

Napoleon III's many projects included the completion of the Louvre Palace, which adjoined his own residence in the Tuileries Palace. The Nouveau Louvre project was led by architect Hector Lefuel between 1852 and 1857. Between 1864 and 1868, Napoleon III also commissioned Lefuel to rebuild the Pavillon de Flore; Lefuel added many of his own decorations and ideas to the pavilion, including a celebrated sculpture of Flore by Jean-Baptiste Carpeaux. Lefuel's grands guichets of the Louvre originally featured an equestrian statue of Napoleon III by Antoine-Louis Barye over the central arch, which was removed during the Third Republic.

== Interior decoration and furniture ==
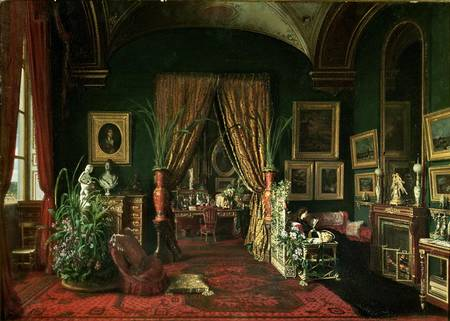
The salon of the Empress Eugénie at the Tuileries Palace

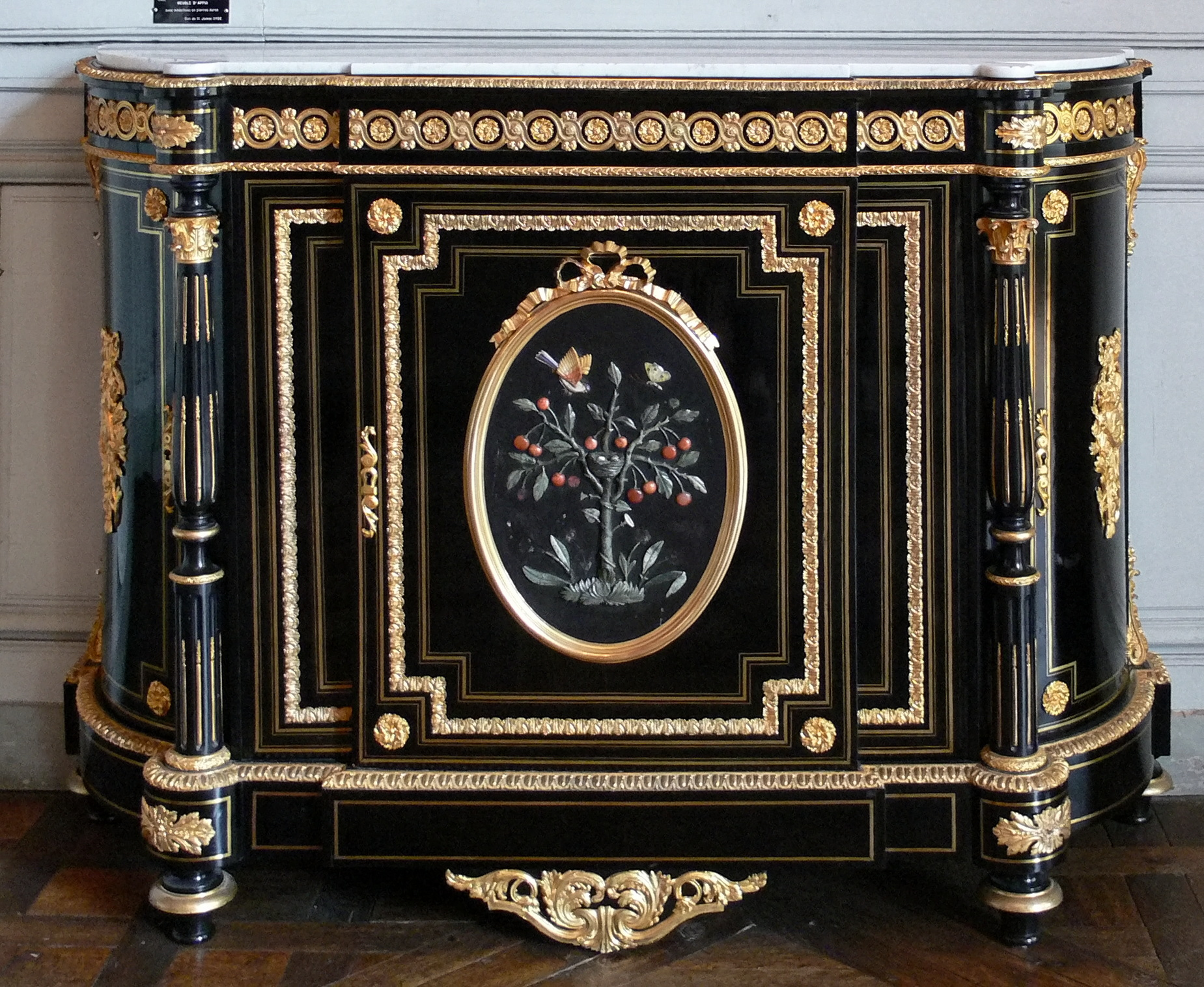
Chest in Napoleon III style, with polychrome floral decoration

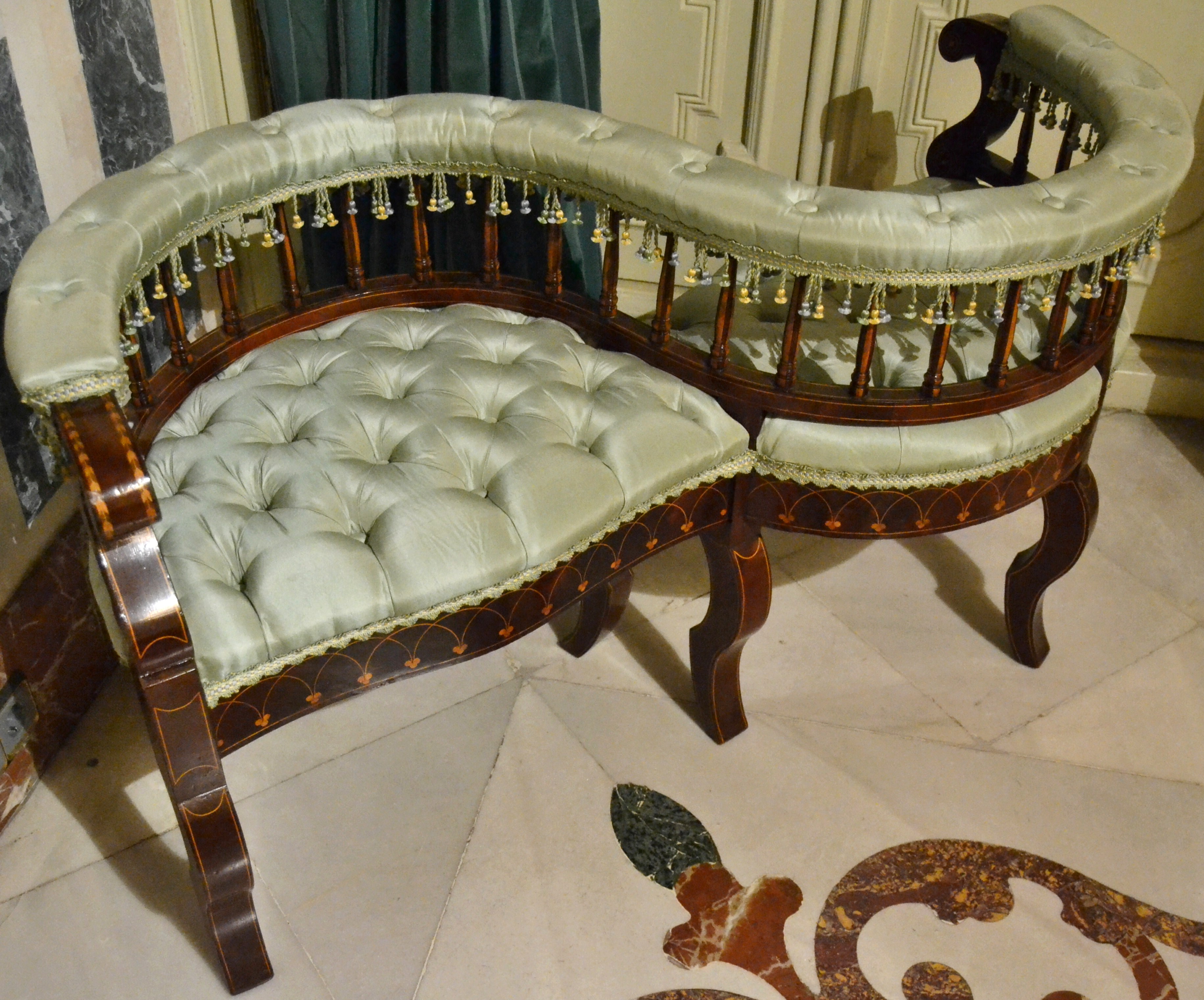
The chair for intimate conversations called le confident

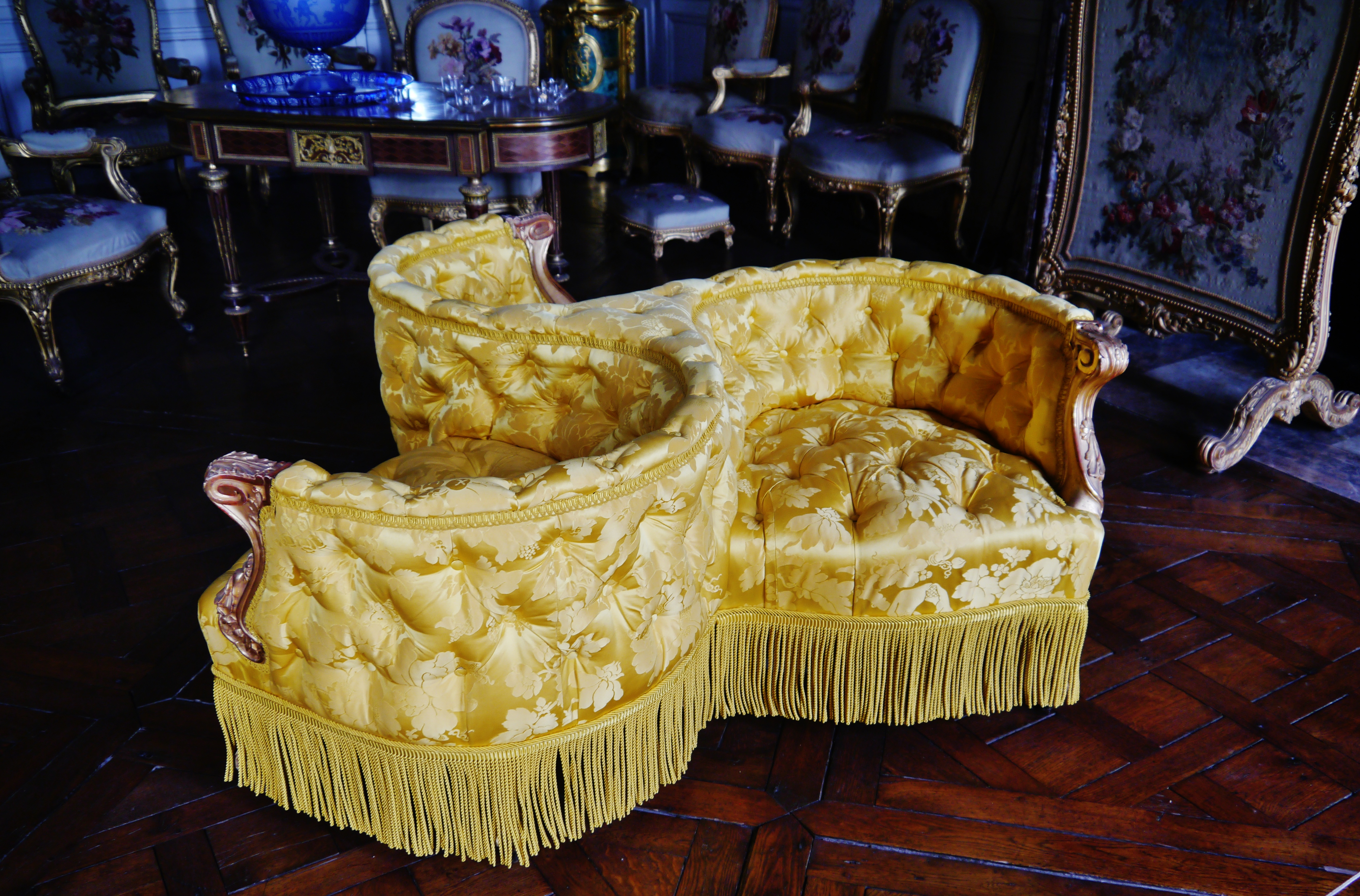
The "Indiscreet", a chair for three persons

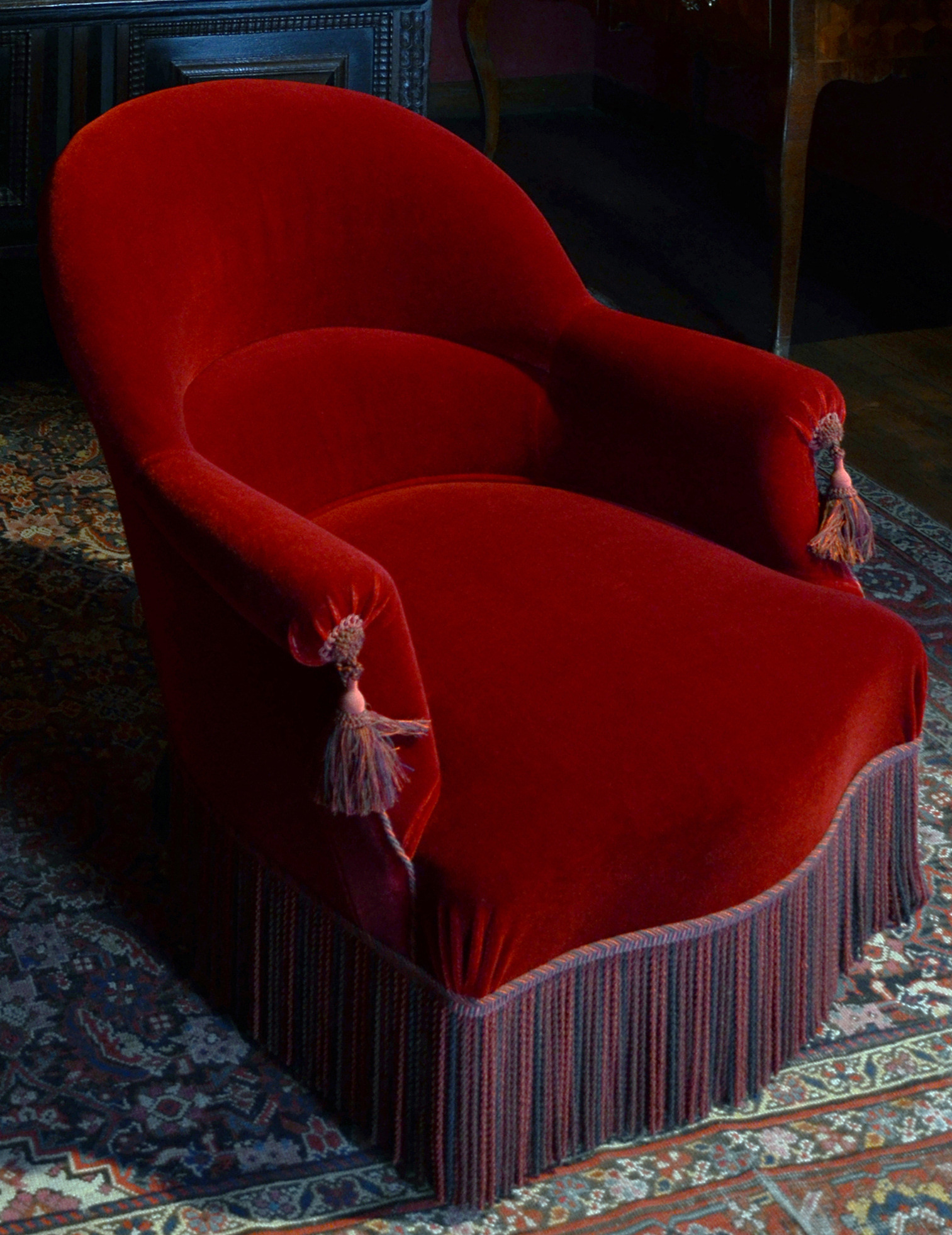
A crapaud armchair with fringe hiding the legs, from the apartment of Victor Hugo

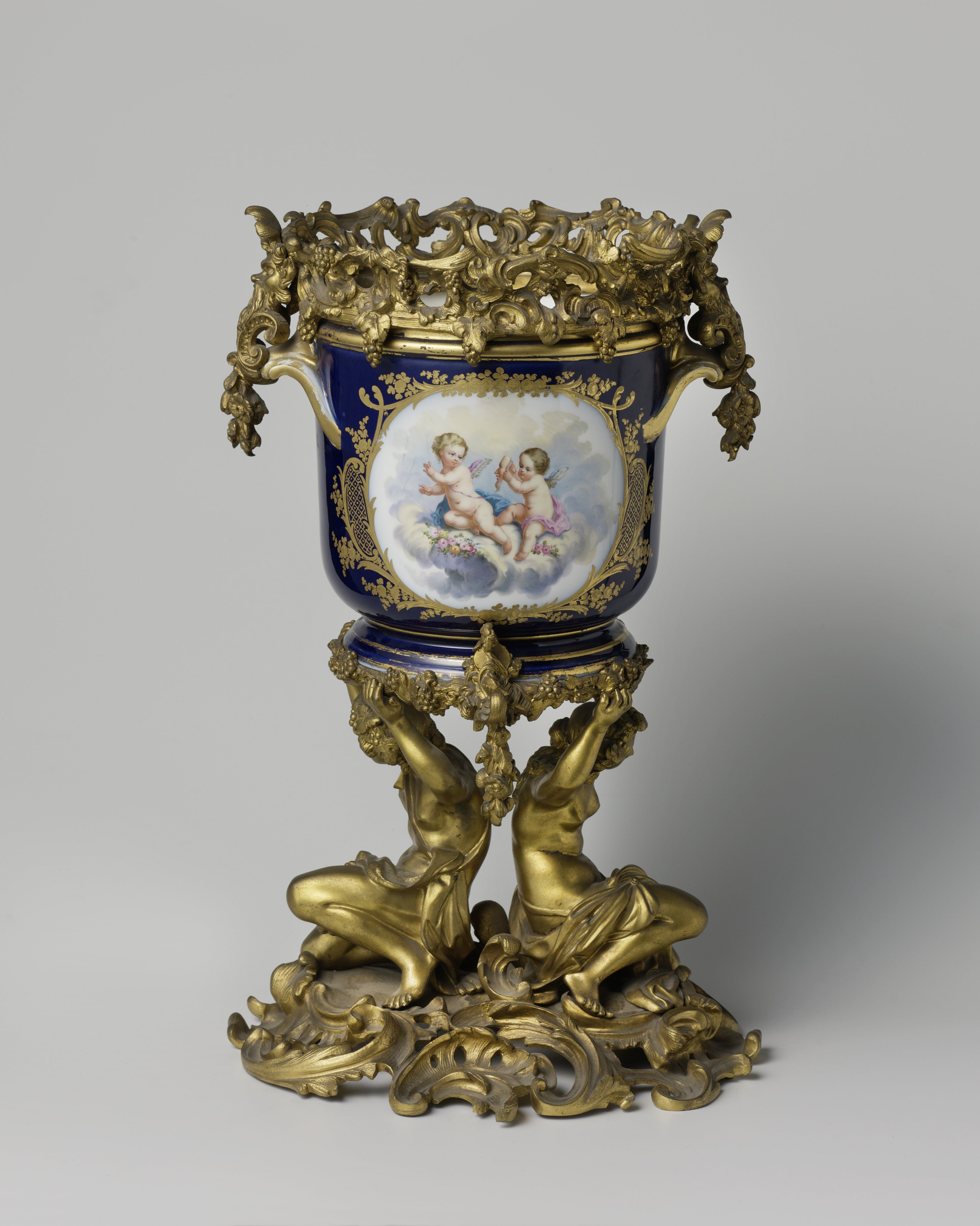
Rococo Revival jardinière with putti and flower sprays, set in a metal frame

Comfort was the first priority of Second Empire furniture. Chairs were elaborately upholstered with fringes, tassels, and expensive fabrics. Tapestry work on furniture was very much in fashion. The structure of chairs and sofas was usually entirely concealed by the upholstery or ornamented with copper, shell, or other decorative elements. Novel and exotic new materials, such as bamboo, papier-mâché, and rattan, were used for the first time in European furniture, along with polychrome wood and wood painted with black lacquer. The upholstered pouffe, or footstool, appeared, along with the angle sofa and unusual chairs designed for intimate conversations between two persons (le confident) or three people (l'indiscret). The crapaud (or toad) armchair was low, with a thickly padded back and arms, and a fringe that concealed the legs.

The French Renaissance and the Henry II style were popular influences on chests and cabinets, buffets and credences, which were massive and built like small cathedrals, decorated with columns, frontons, cartouches, mascarons, and carved angels and chimeras. They were usually constructed of walnut or oak, or sometimes of pear wood stained to resemble ebony.

Another popular influence was the Louis XVI style, or French neoclassicism, which was the preferred style of the Empress Eugénie. Her rooms at the Tuileries Palace and other palaces were decorated in this manner.

== Urbanism – Haussmann's renovation of Paris ==
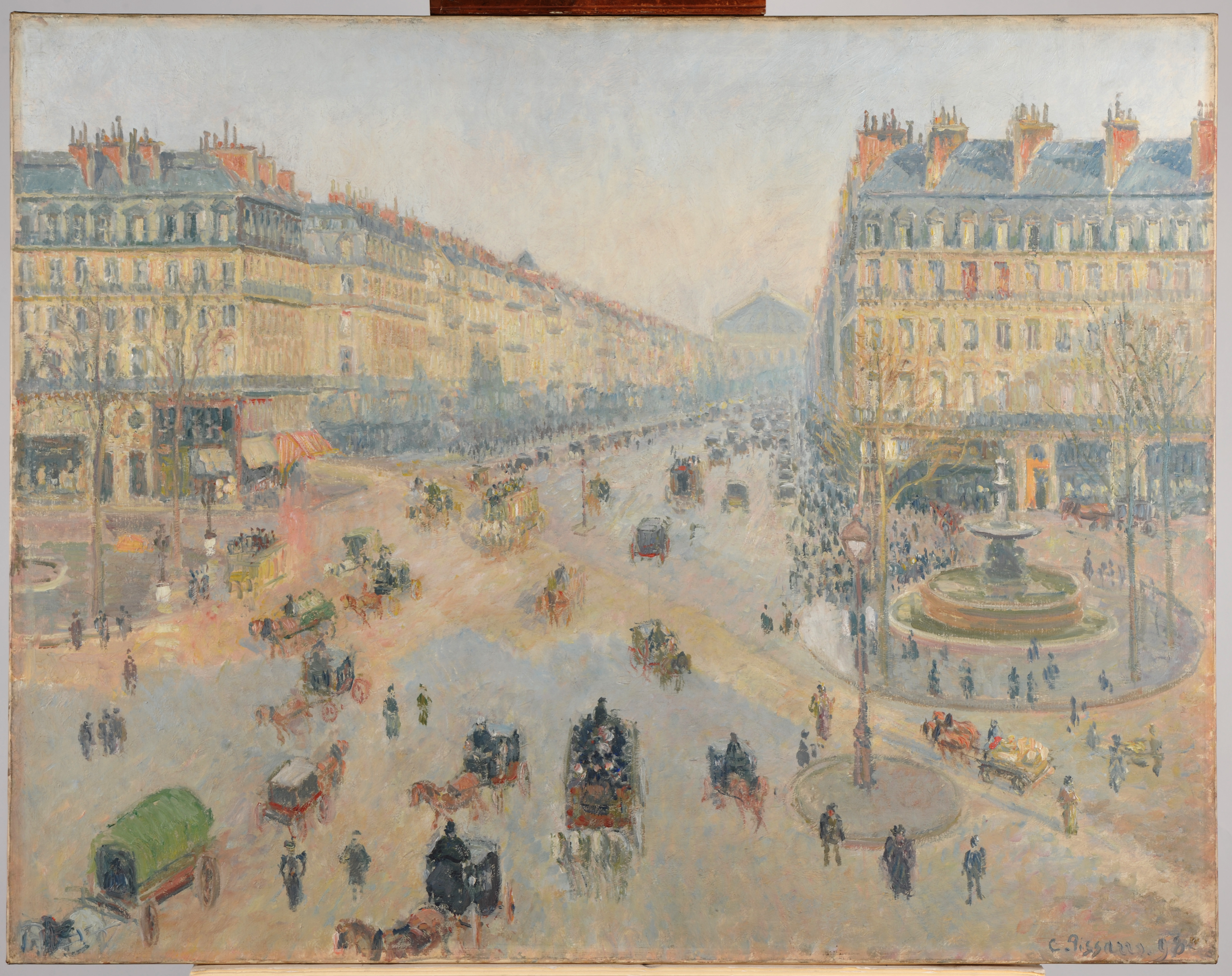
The Avenue de l'Opéra painted by Camille Pissarro (1898)

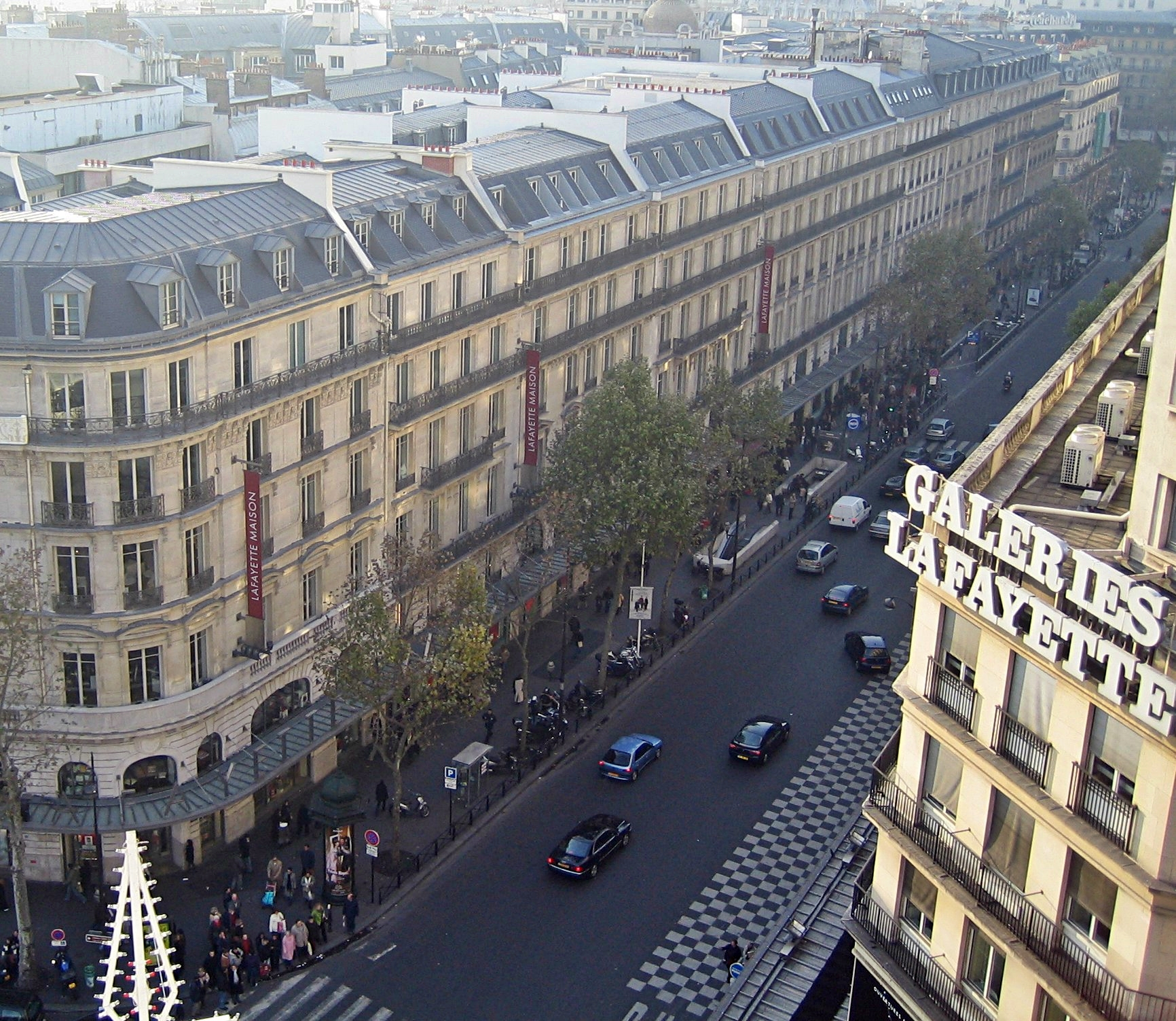
Boulevard Haussmann, with the classic Haussmann-style apartment buildings (1870)

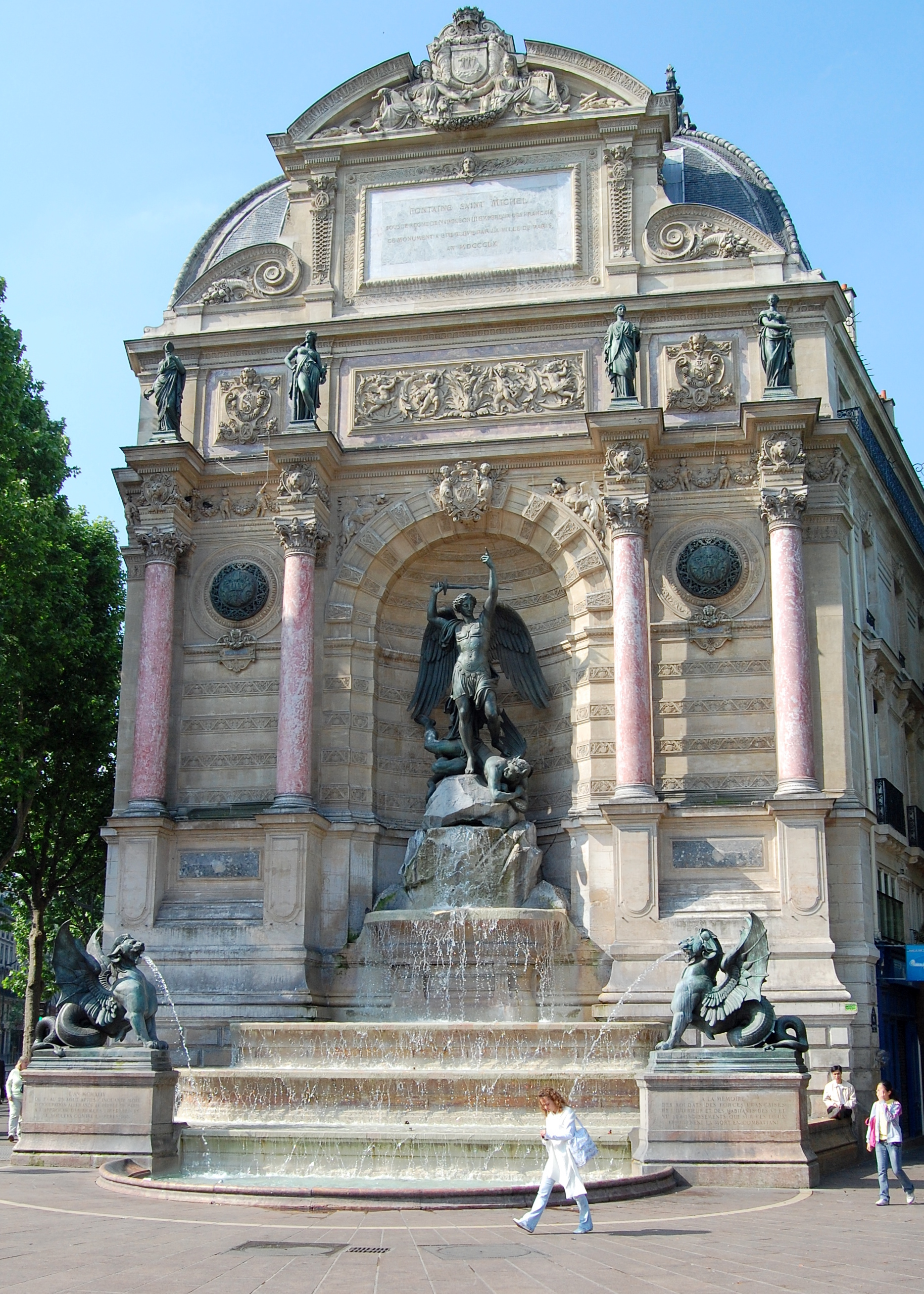
The Fontaine Saint-Michel by Gabriel Davioud (1856–61)

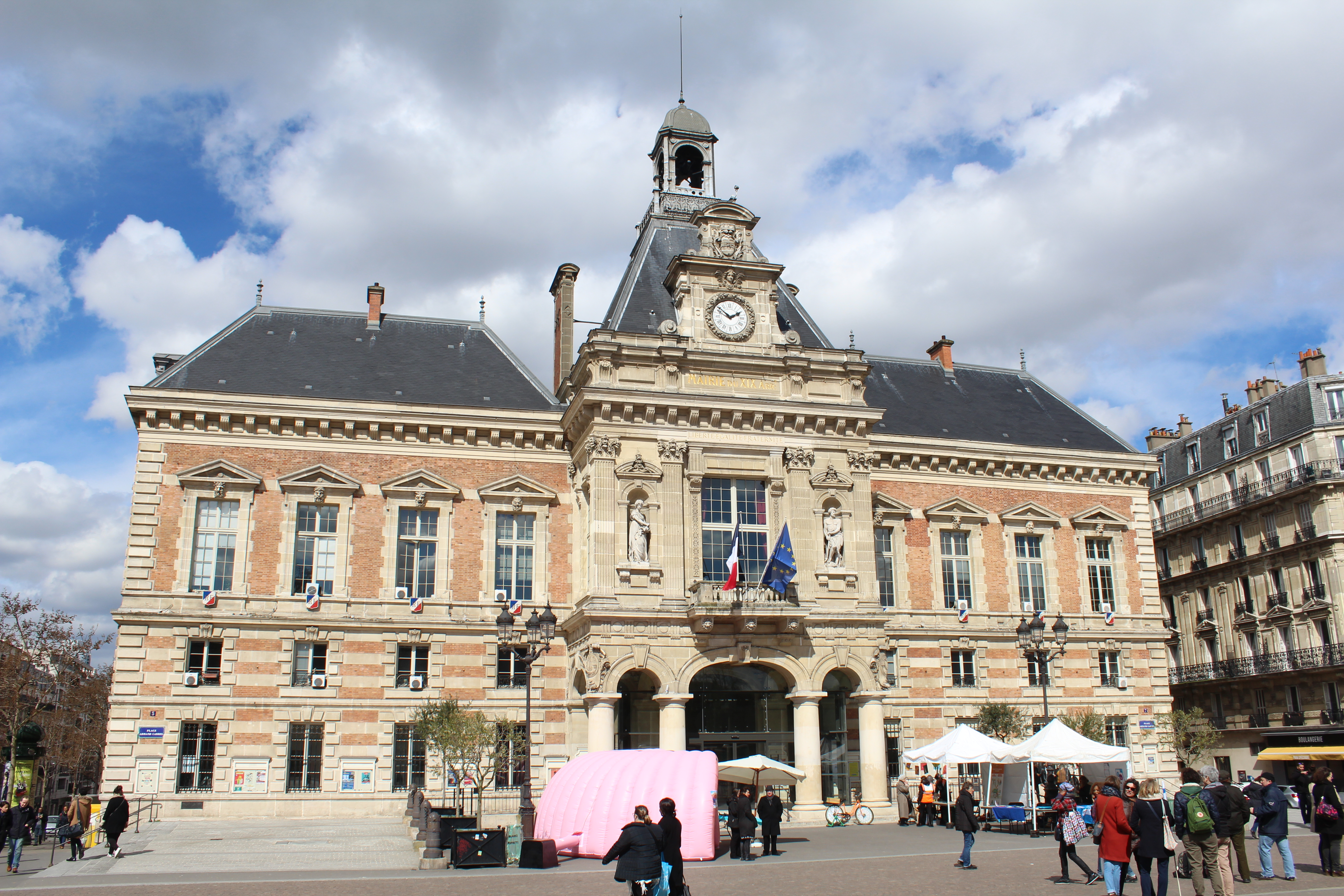
Mairie of the 19th arrondissement in Paris, by Gabriel Davioud

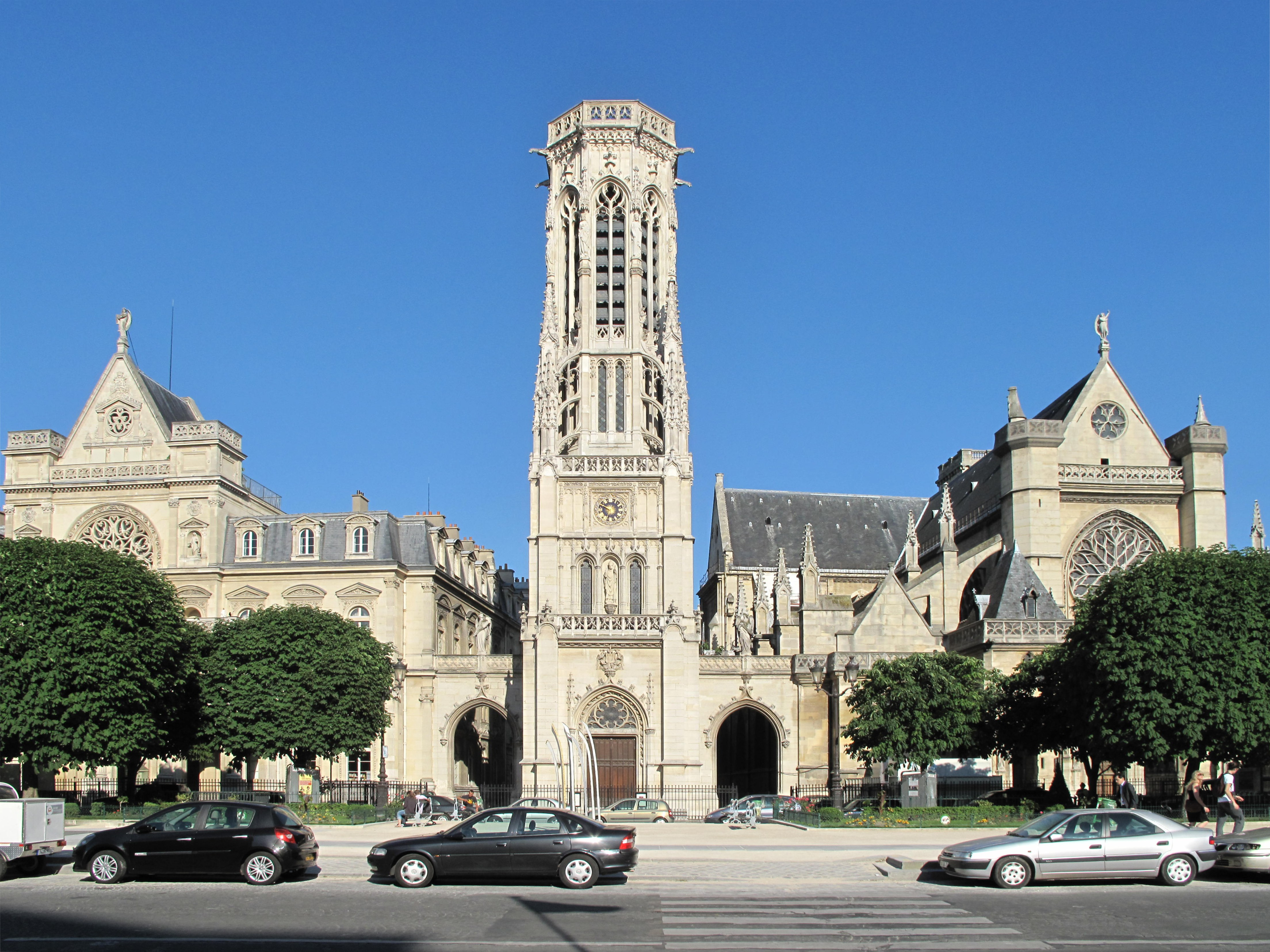
New city hall of the 1st arrondissement (1855–60) (left) and new bell tower (1862) matching the Gothic Church of Saint-Germain l'Auxerrois

The Napoleon III style is inseparable from the renovation of Paris under Georges-Eugène Haussmann, the Emperor's Prefect of the Seine between 1852 and 1870. The buildings of the renovation display a singularity of purpose and design, a consistency of urban planning that was unusual for the period. Numerous public edifices — railway stations, the tribunal de commerce de Paris, and the Palais Garnier — were constructed in the style. The major buildings, including the Opera House and the Church of Saint Augustine, were designed to serve as the focal points of the new avenues and to be visible from a great distance.

Napoleon III also built monumental fountains to decorate the heart of the city; his Paris city architect, Gabriel Davioud, designed the polychrome Fontaine Saint-Michel (officially the Fontaine de la Paix) at the head of Haussmann's new Boulevard Saint-Michel. Davioud's other major Napoleon III works included the two theatres at the Place du Châtelet, as well as the ornamental fence of Parc Monceau and the kiosks and temples of the Bois de Boulogne, Bois de Vincennes, and other Paris parks.

The expansion of the city limits by Napoleon III and Haussmann's new boulevards called for the construction of a variety of new public buildings, including the new tribunal de commerce (1861–67), influenced by the French Renaissance style, by Théodore Ballu; and the new city hall of the 1st arrondissement by Jacques Ignace Hittorff (1855–60), combining Renaissance and Gothic styles. The new city hall was located beside the Gothic church of Saint-Germain l'Auxerrois. Between the two structures, the architect Théodore Ballu constructed a Gothic bell tower (1862) to link the two buildings.

New types of architecture connected with economic expansion — railway stations, hotels, office buildings, department stores, and exposition halls — came to occupy the centre of Paris, which had previously been largely residential. To improve traffic circulation and bring light and air to the city centre, Napoleon's Prefect of the Seine cleared the overcrowded neighbourhoods at the heart of the city and built a network of grand boulevards. The expanded use of new building materials, especially iron frames, allowed the construction of far larger buildings for commerce and industry.

== Architectural restoration ==
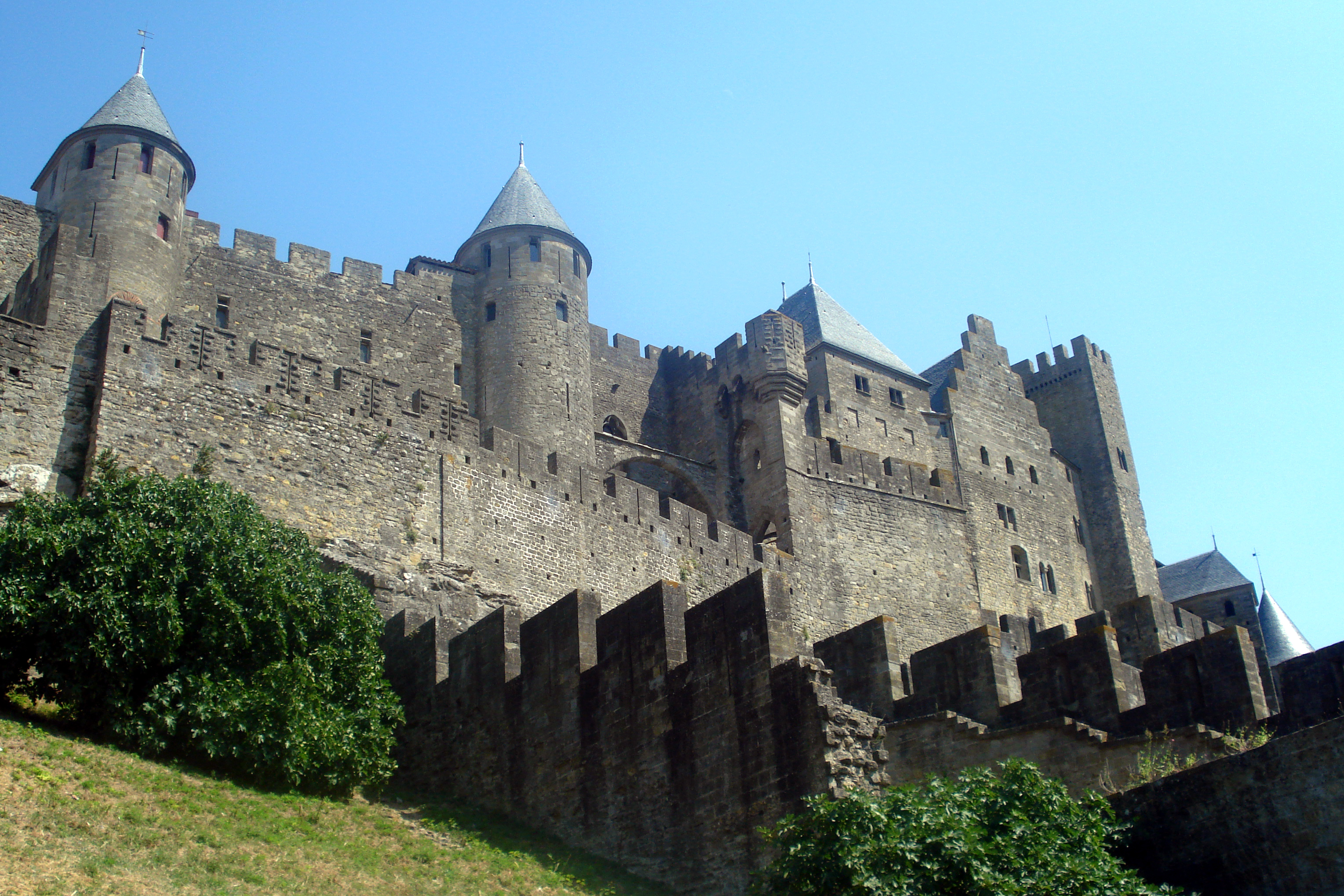
Napoleon III commissioned Eugène Viollet-le-Duc to restore the medieval town of Carcassonne in 1853.

Another aspect of the Napoleon III style was the restoration of historical monuments that had been badly damaged during the French Revolution or were threatened with destruction by the growth of cities. This programme was largely carried out by Eugène Viollet-le-Duc, whose neo-Gothic design for a new Paris Opera had come in second to that of Garnier. The restoration of Notre-Dame de Paris, begun in 1845, continued for twenty-five years. Some of its additions departed from the originals. Viollet-le-Duc restored the flèche, or spirelet, of the cathedral — which had been partially destroyed and desecrated during the French Revolution — in a slightly different style, and added gargoyles to the façade that had not originally been present.

In 1855, he completed the restoration, begun in 1845, of the stained glass windows of the Sainte-Chapelle, and in 1862 declared it a national historical monument. He also initiated restoration programmes for the medieval walls of the Cité de Carcassonne and other sites. Viollet-le-Duc's restorations were criticised in the late 20th century for sometimes pursuing the spirit of the original work rather than strict historical accuracy — for example, using a type of Gothic tower cap from northern France for the walls of Carcassonne, rather than a design from that region — but in Carcassonne and elsewhere the structures would have been destroyed entirely without the intervention of Napoleon III and Viollet-le-Duc.

== Landscape design ==
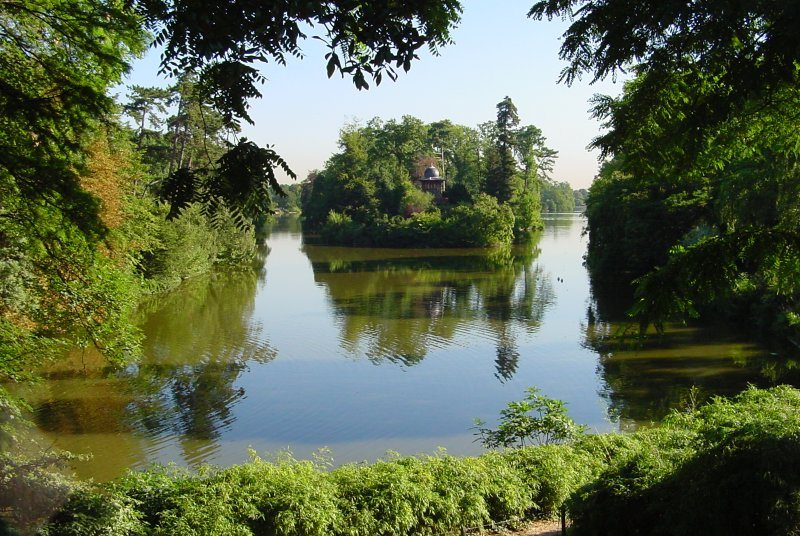
The Bois de Boulogne, built between 1852 and 1858, was designed to give a place for relaxation and recreation to all classes of Parisians.

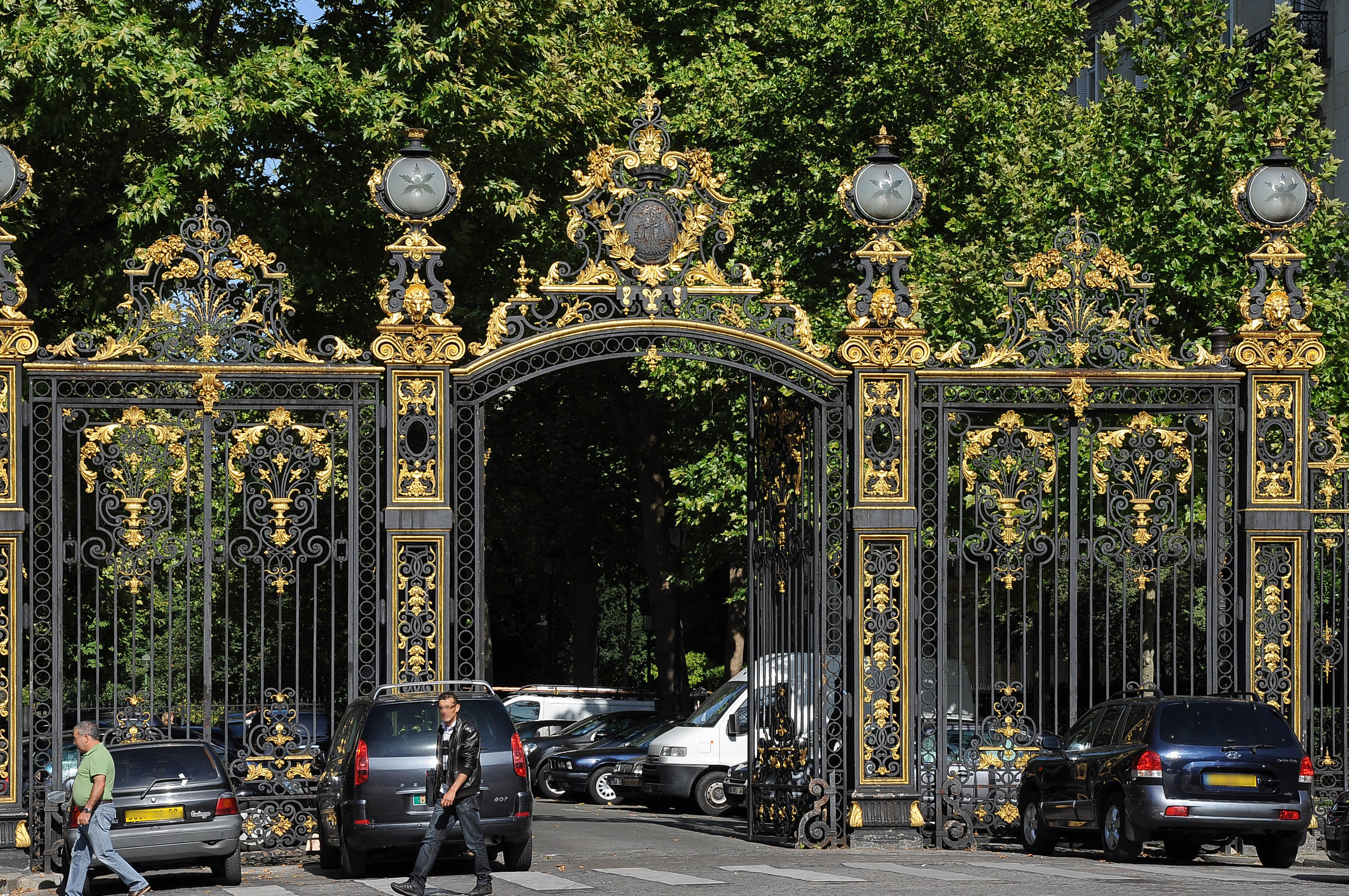
The monumental gates of the Parc Monceau designed by the city architect Gabriel Davioud

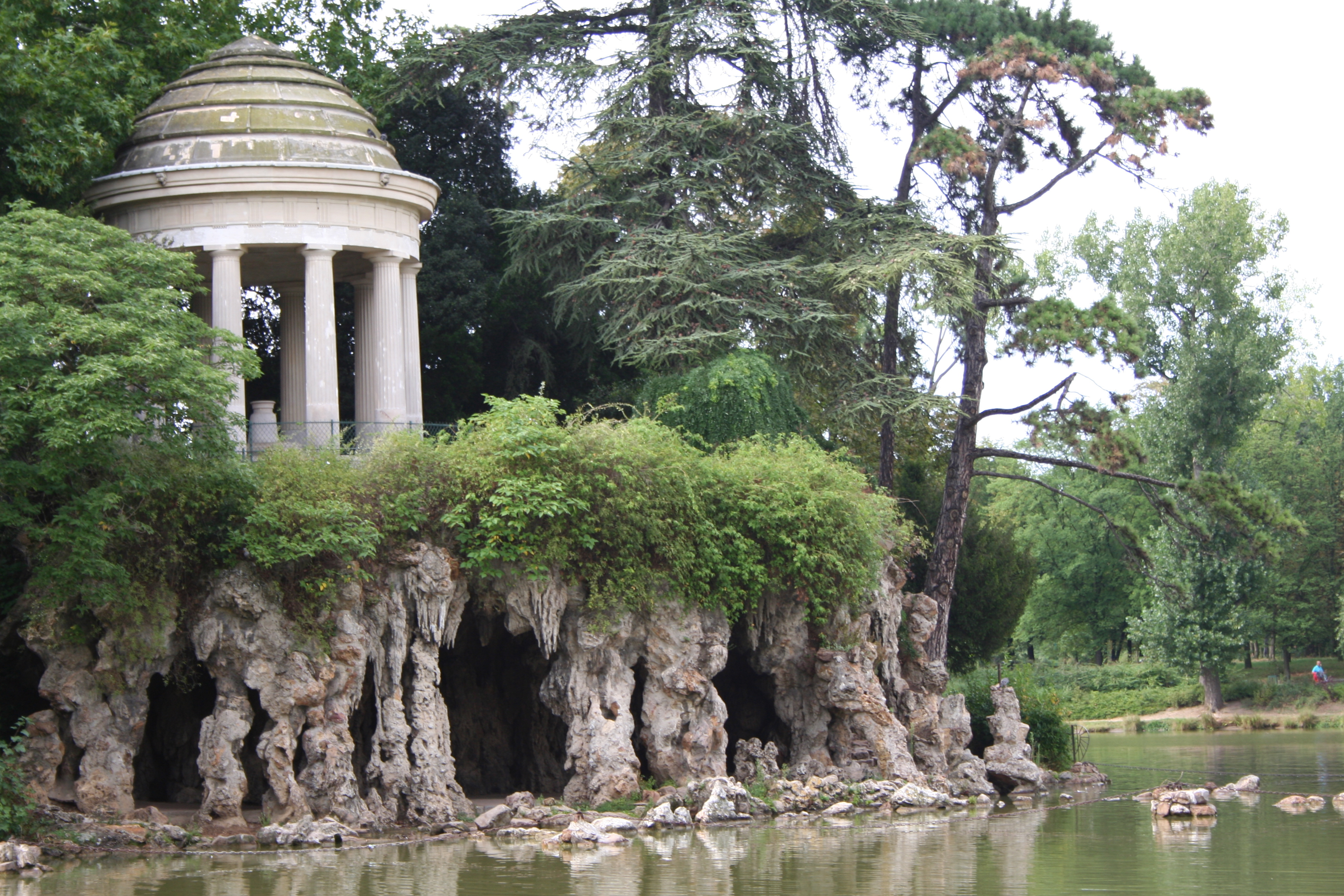
The Temple of Love on Lac Daumesnil in the Bois de Vincennes (1865)

Napoleon III appointed Georges-Eugène Haussmann as his new Prefect of the Seine in 1853 and commissioned him to build new parks on the edges of the city, modelled on Hyde Park in London, which he had frequented during his years in exile. Haussmann assembled a remarkable team: Jean-Charles Adolphe Alphand, the city's first Director of the new Service of Promenades and Plantations; Jean-Pierre Barillet-Deschamps, the city's first gardener-in-chief; Eugène Belgrand, a hydraulic engineer who rebuilt the city's sewers and water supply and provided the water needed for the parks; and Gabriel Davioud, the city's chief architect, who designed chalets, temples, grottos, follies, fences, gates, lodges, lampposts, and other park structures.

Over the course of seventeen years, Napoleon III, Haussmann, and Alphand created 1,835 hectares of new parks and gardens and planted more than six hundred thousand trees — the greatest expansion of Paris green space before or since. They built four major parks in the north, south, east, and west of the city, replanted and renovated the historic parks, and added dozens of small squares and gardens, so that no one lived more than ten minutes from a park or square. In addition, they planted tens of thousands of trees along the new boulevards that Haussmann created, extending from the centre to the outer neighbourhoods. The parks of Paris provided entertainment and relaxation for all classes of Parisians throughout the Second Empire.

The Napoleon III approach to landscape design for urban parks proved highly influential outside France. The American landscape designer Frederick Law Olmsted kept a map of the Bois de Boulogne on the wall of his office. Both Central Park in New York City and Golden Gate Park in San Francisco reflect the influence of the Napoleon III parks.

== Painting – the Paris Salon ==
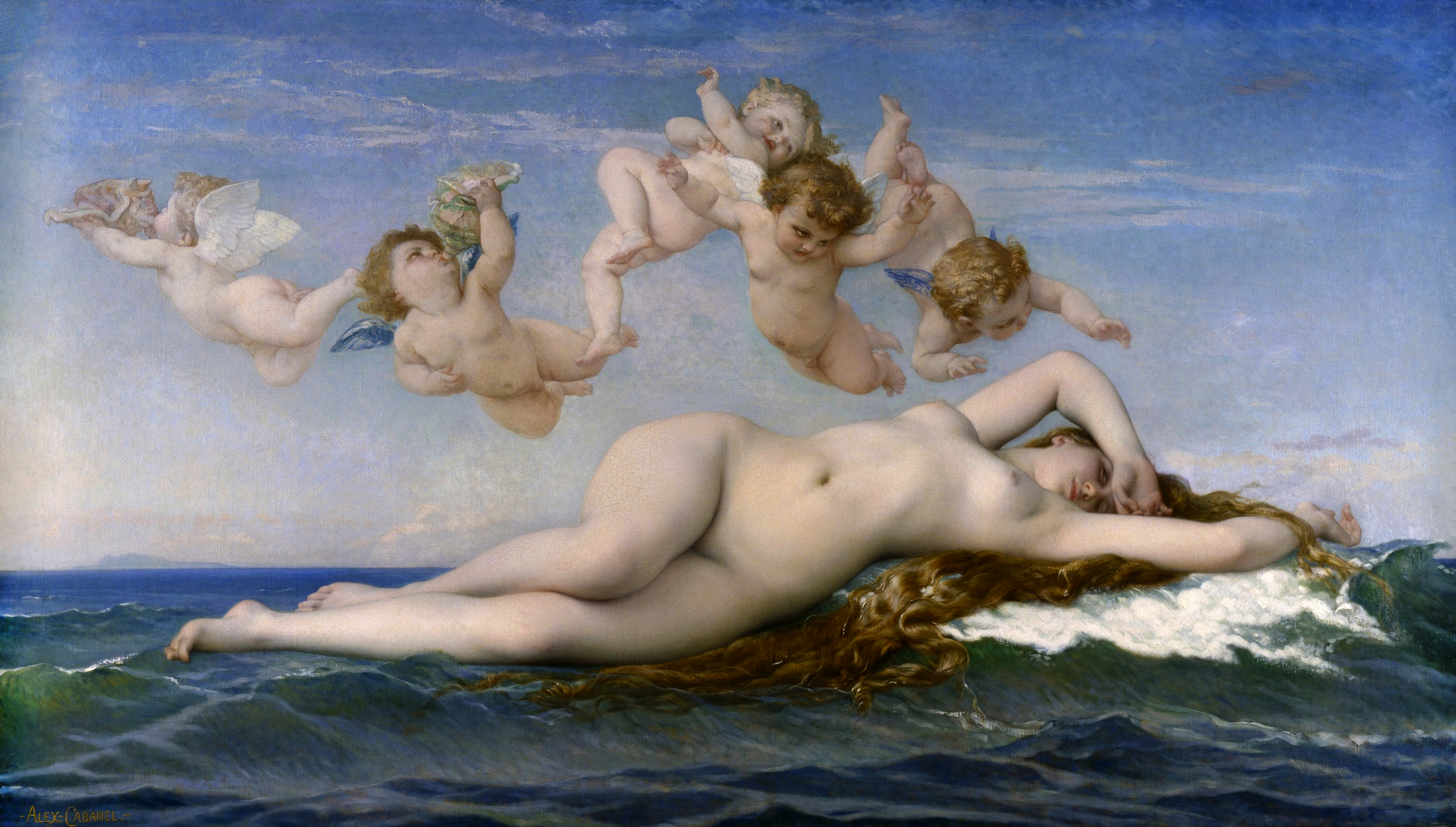
The Birth of Venus by Alexandre Cabanel, purchased by Napoleon III at the Paris Salon of 1863; now in the Musée d'Orsay

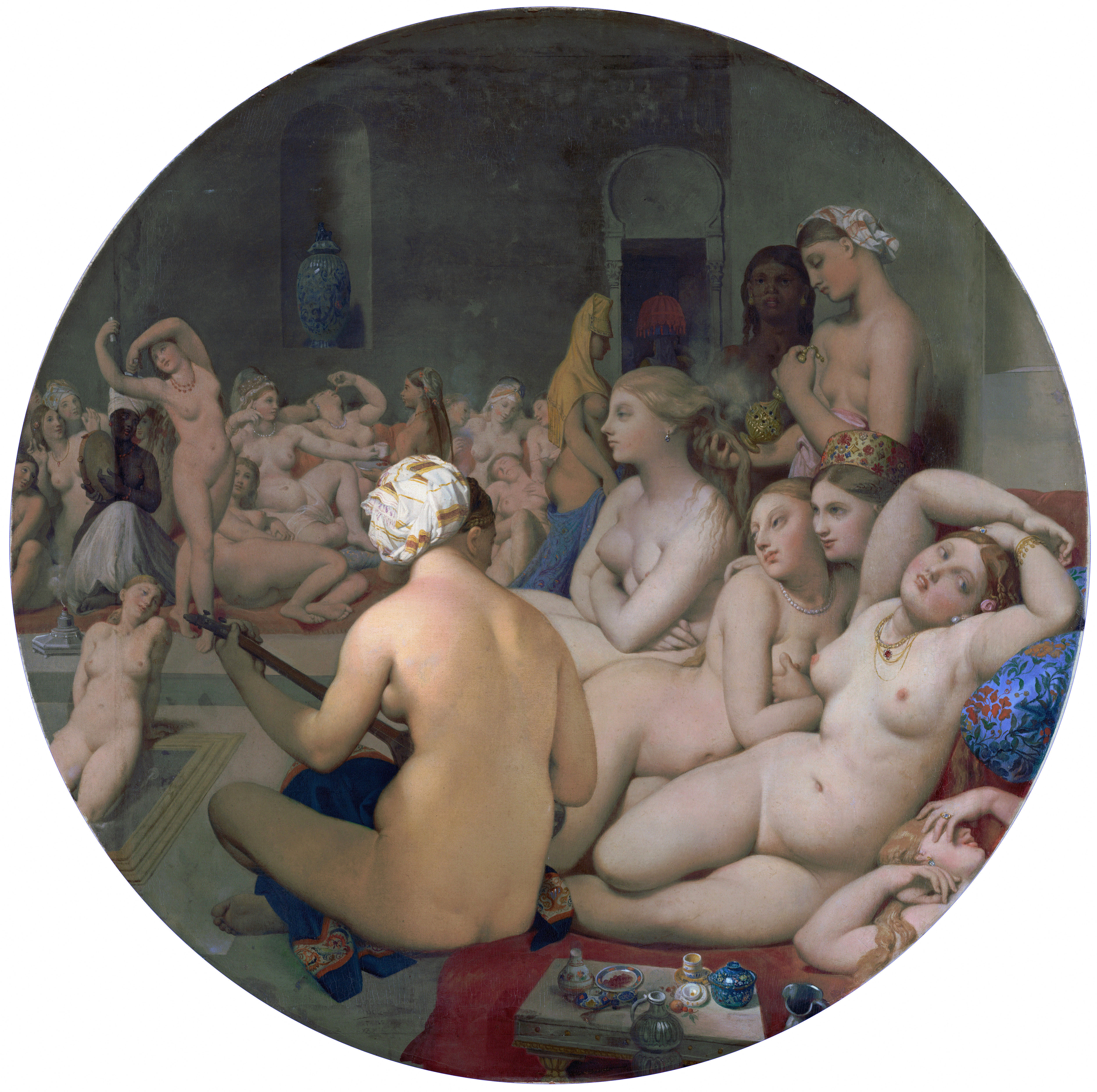
The Turkish Bath by Jean-Auguste-Dominique Ingres (1862), the Louvre

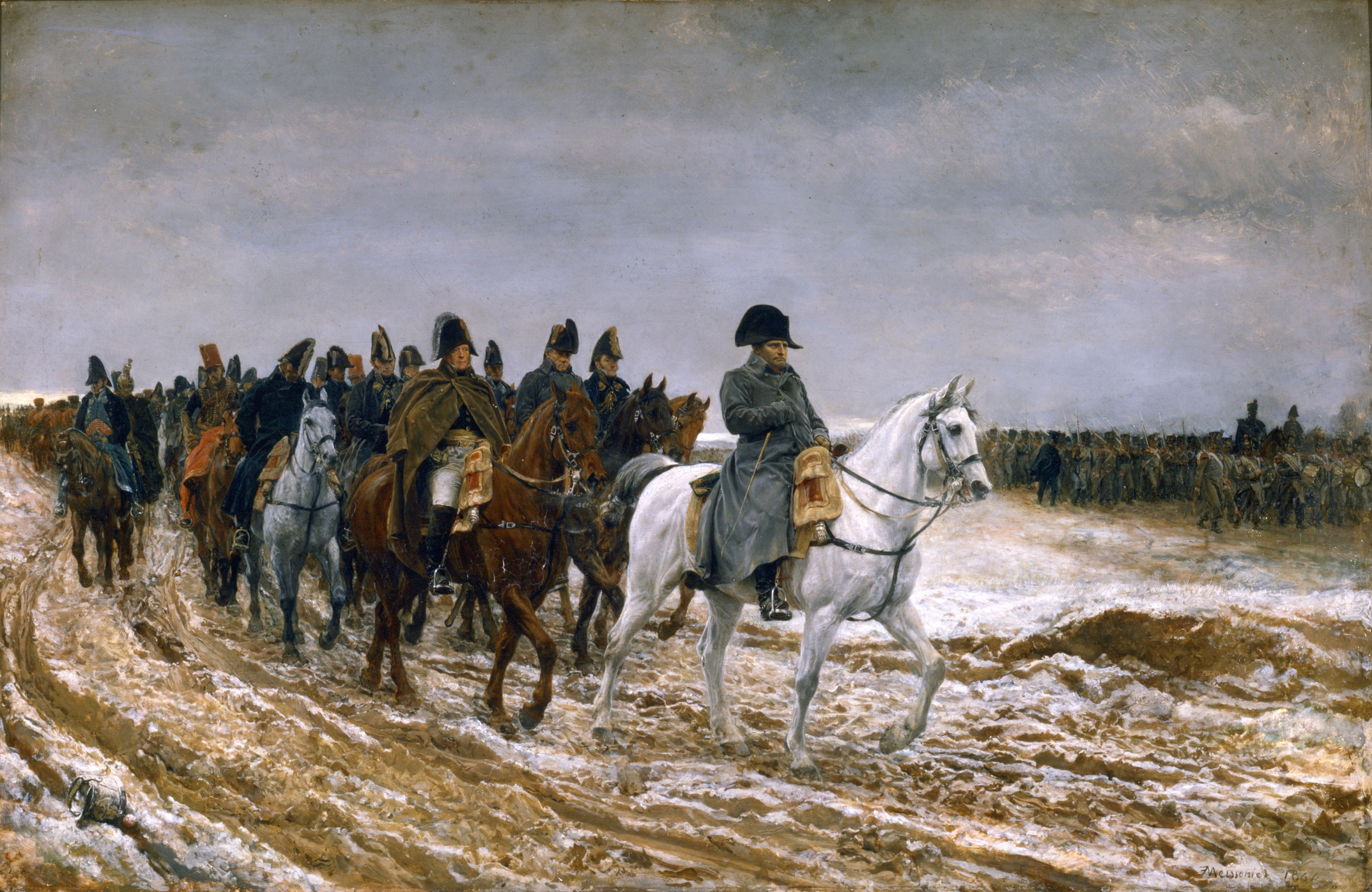
Campagne de France 1814 by Ernest Meissonier (1864), Musée d'Orsay

Napoleon III's taste in painting was quite traditional, favouring the academic style cultivated in the Académie des Beaux-Arts. His preferred artists included Alexandre Cabanel, Ernest Meissonier, Jean-Léon Gérôme, and William-Adolphe Bouguereau, who received important state commissions. Ingres, near the end of his life, remained an important figure in both portrait and history painting.

During the Second Empire, the Paris Salon was the most important annual event for painters, engravers, and sculptors. It was held every two years until 1861, and annually thereafter, in the Palais de l'Industrie, a gigantic exhibition hall built for the Paris Exposition Universelle of 1855. The Salon awarded medals according to the traditional hierarchy of genres, and a Salon medal assured an artist of commissions from wealthy patrons or from the French government. Painters devoted considerable effort and intrigue to winning jury approval to exhibit at the Salon and to secure favourable placement within the galleries.

The Paris Salon was directed by Count Émilien de Nieuwerkerke, the Superintendent of Fine Arts, who was known for his conservative tastes and his scorn for the new school of Realist painters led by Gustave Courbet. In 1863, the Salon jury refused all submissions by avant-garde artists, including works by Édouard Manet, Camille Pissarro, and Johan Jongkind. The artists and their supporters complained, and the complaints reached Napoleon III. His office issued a statement: "Numerous complaints have come to the Emperor on the subject of the works of art which were refused by the jury of the Exposition. His Majesty, wishing to let the public judge the legitimacy of these complaints, has decided that the works of art which were refused should be displayed in another part of the Palace of Industry."

Following Napoleon's decree, an exhibition of the refused paintings — the Salon des Refusés — was held in another part of the Palace of Industry. More than a thousand visitors a day came to see works now regarded as landmarks, including Édouard Manet's Le Déjeuner sur l'herbe and James McNeill Whistler's Symphony in White, No. 1: The White Girl. The journalist Émile Zola reported that visitors crowded into the galleries where the rejected paintings hung, and that the rooms were filled with laughter and mocking comments. While the works were ridiculed by many critics and visitors, the avant-garde became known for the first time to the French public and took its place alongside the more traditional Salon style.

The government of Napoleon III also commissioned artists to produce decorative works for public buildings. Ingres was commissioned to paint the ceiling of the main salon of the Hôtel de Ville, Paris with The Apotheosis of Napoleon, the Emperor's uncle. The painting was destroyed in 1871 when the building was set alight by the Paris Commune. Napoleon III named Ingres a Grand Officer of the Légion d'honneur. In 1862 Ingres was awarded the title of Senator and made a member of the Imperial Council on Public Instruction.

Eugène Delacroix also received important official commissions. From 1857 to 1861 he worked on frescoes for the Chapelle des Anges at the Church of Saint-Sulpice, Paris, including "The Battle of Jacob with the Angel", "Saint Michael Slaying the Dragon", and "The Expulsion of Heliodorus from the Temple".

Jean-Baptiste-Camille Corot began his career with academic training at the École des Beaux-Arts, but gradually began to paint more freely, expressing emotion through his landscapes. His motto was "never lose that first impression which we feel." He made sketches in the forests around Paris and then reworked them into finished paintings in his studio. He had exhibited at the Salon as early as 1827, but did not achieve widespread recognition until 1855, during the Second Empire.

== Birth of a new art movement ==
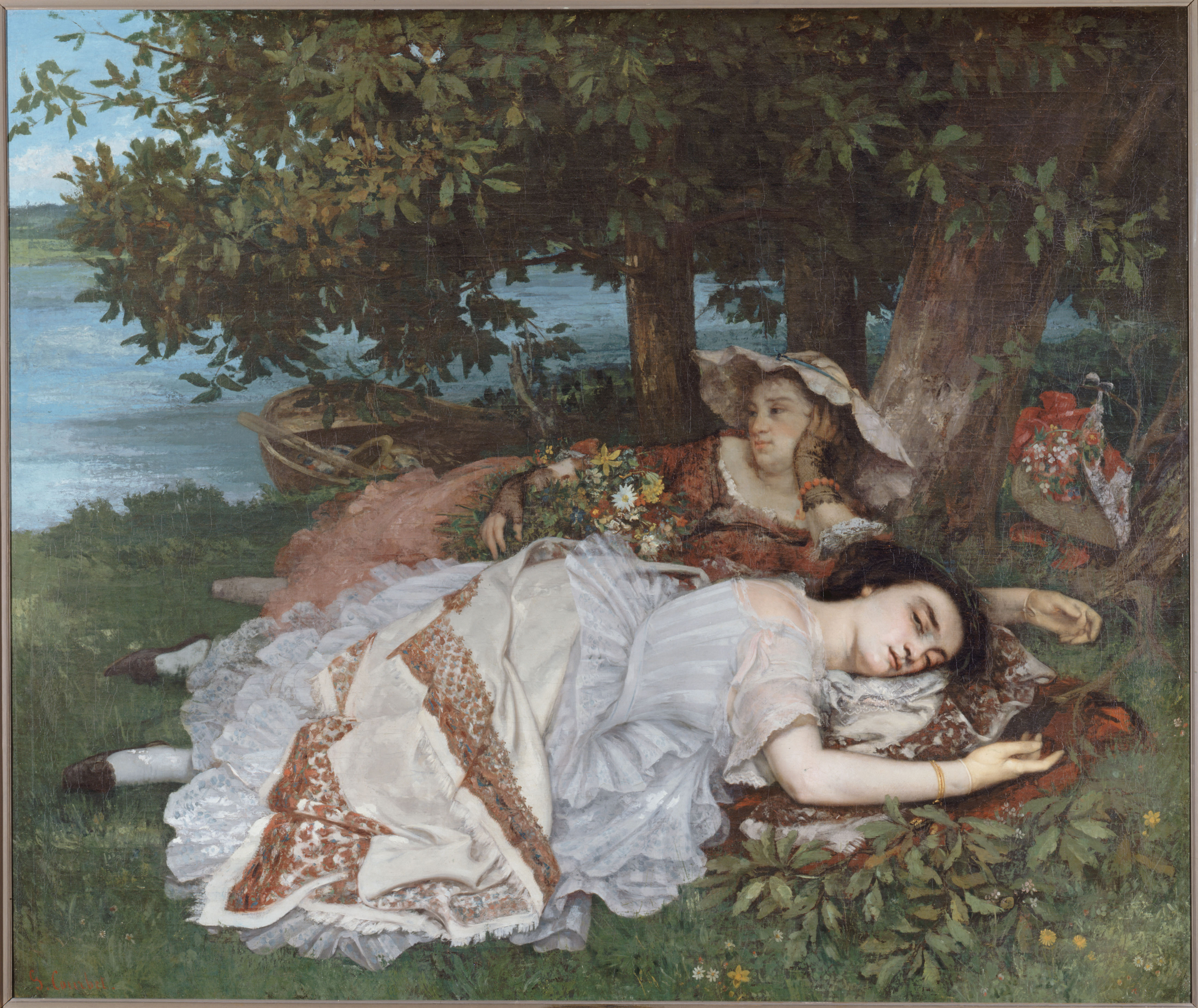
Gustave Courbet's Young Ladies Beside the Seine (Summer) (1856) caused a scandal at the Paris Salon, much to the delight of the artist

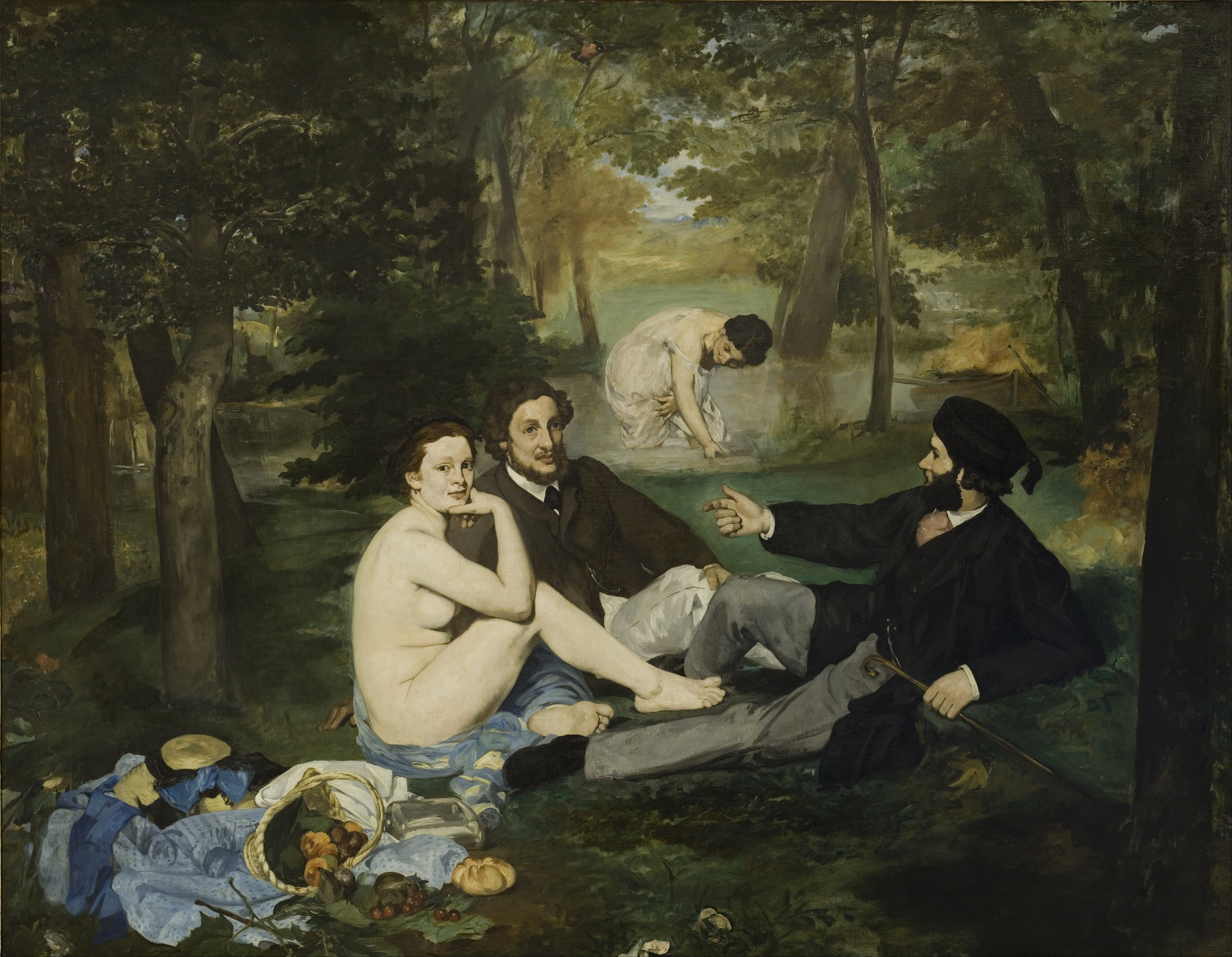
Luncheon on the Grass by Édouard Manet also caused a scandal at the Paris Salon of 1863 and helped make Manet famous

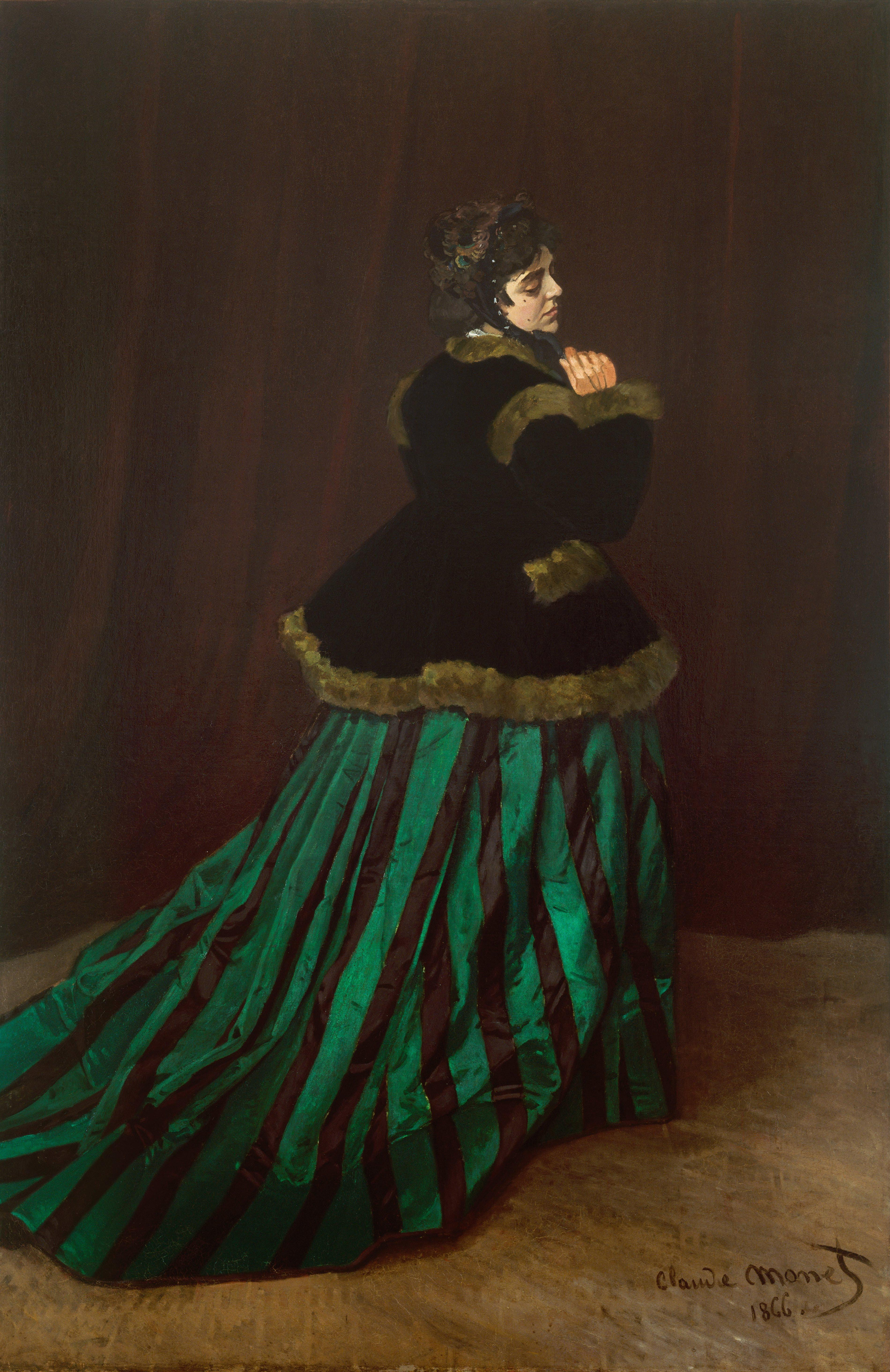
Claude Monet exhibited a portrait of his future wife Camille Doncieux at the Paris Salon of 1866 under the title Woman in a Green Dress

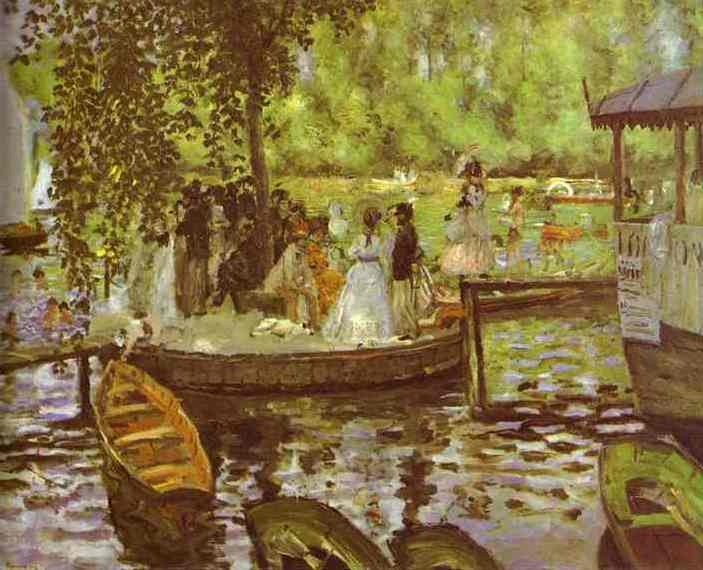
La Grenouillère by Pierre-Auguste Renoir. Renoir studied art in Paris in 1862 and showed this painting at the Paris Salon of 1869.

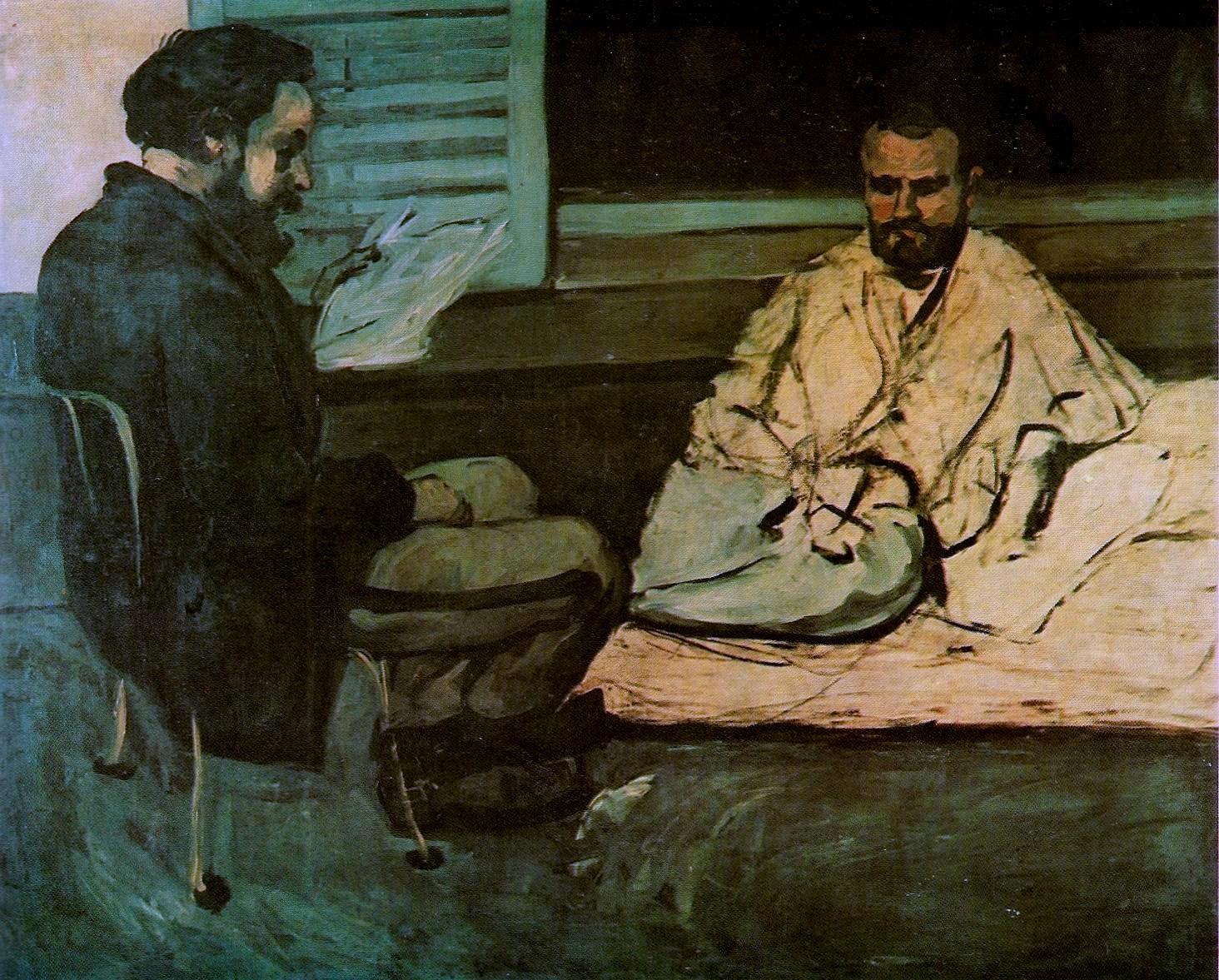
Paul Cézanne produced a portrait of Paul Alexis reading to Cézanne's friend Émile Zola in 1869–70

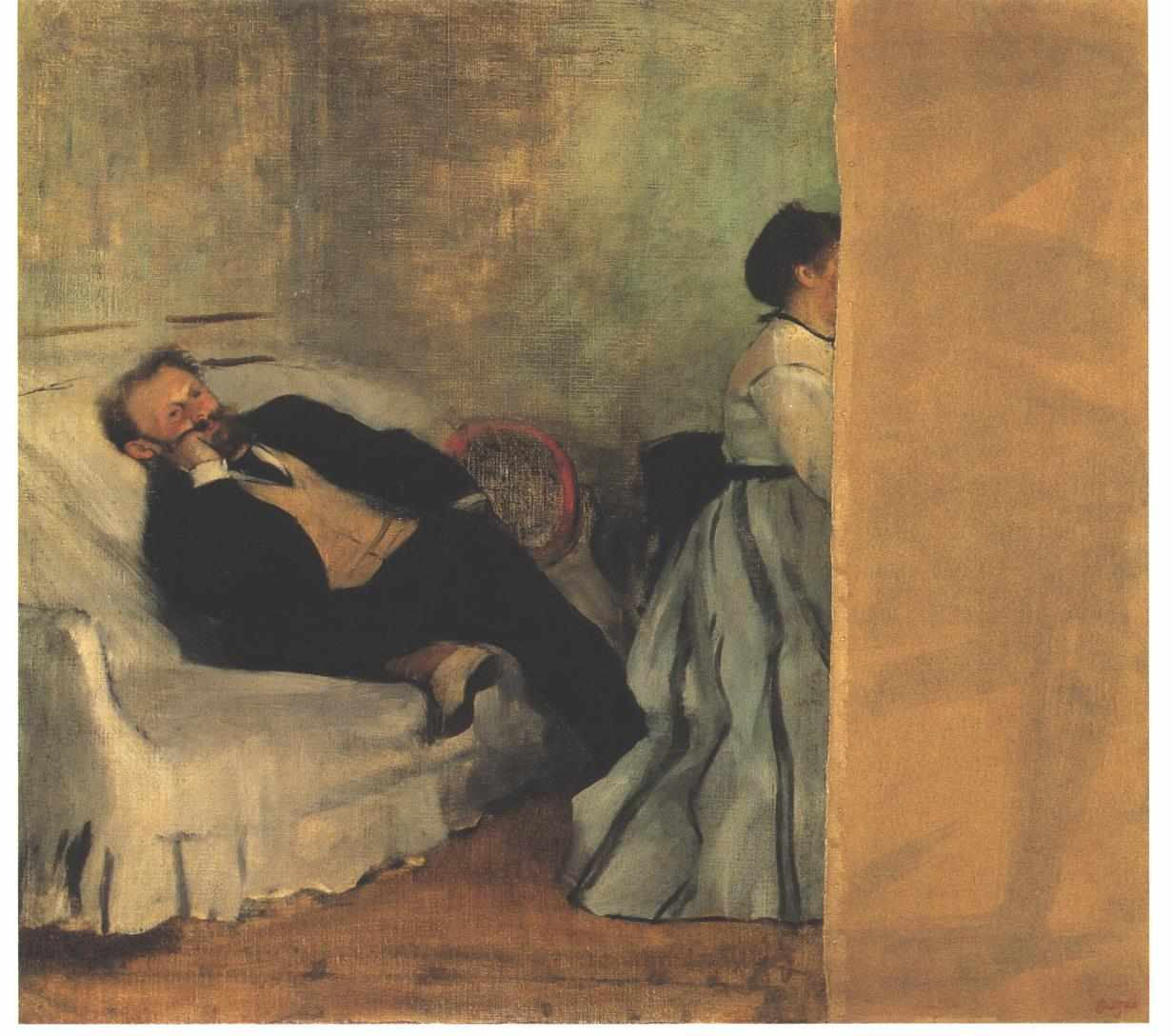
A portrait of Édouard Manet and his wife by Edgar Degas (1868–69)

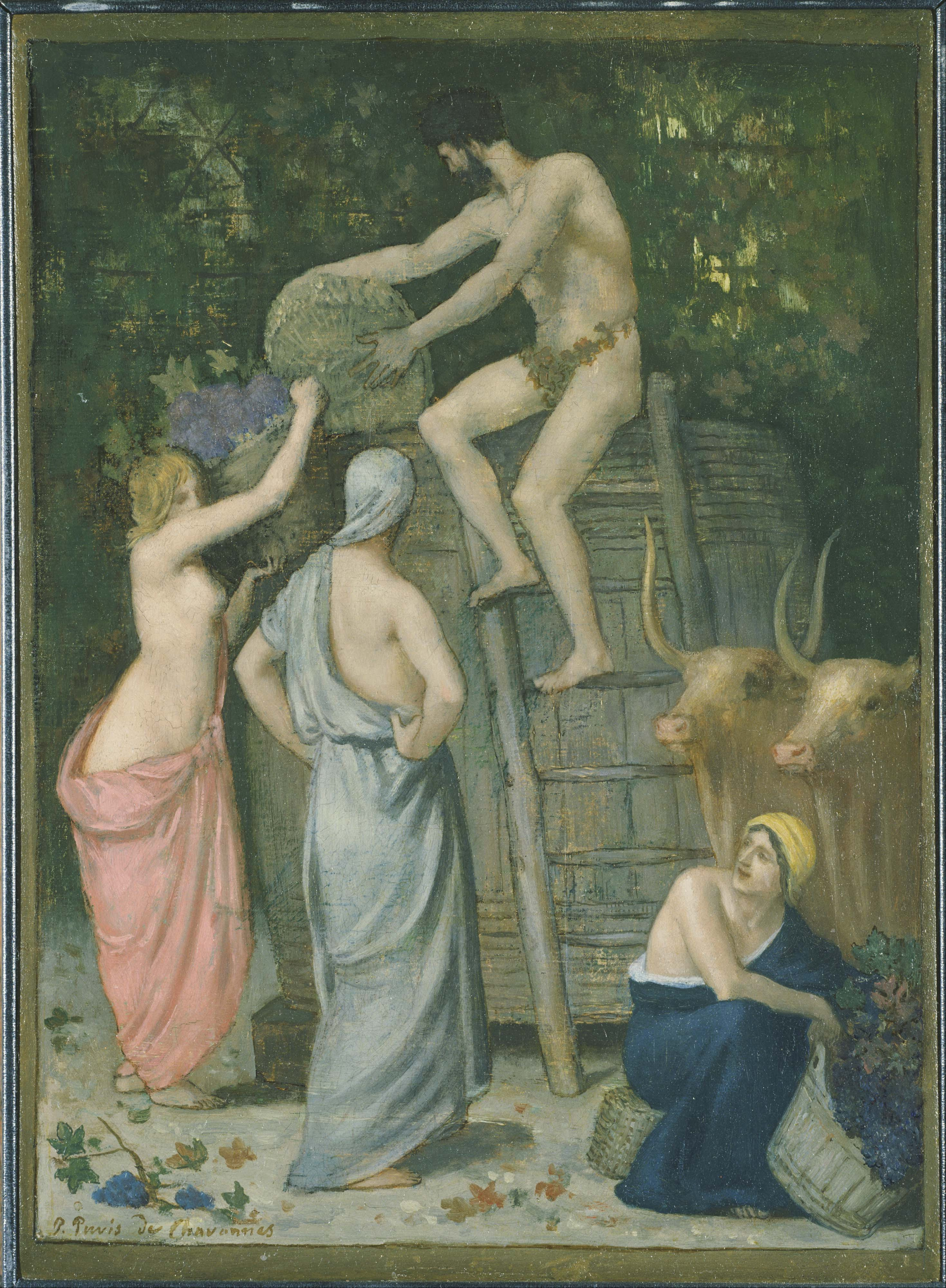
The Wine Press by Puvis de Chavannes

While the academic painters dominated the Salon, new artists and new movements rose to prominence under Napoleon III. Gustave Courbet (1819–1877) was the leader of the realist school during the Second Empire, depicting the lives of ordinary people and rural subjects alongside landscapes. He delighted in scandal and condemned the art establishment, the Academy of Fine Arts, and Napoleon III. In 1855, when his submissions to the Salon were rejected, he mounted his own exhibition of forty paintings in a nearby building. In 1870, Napoleon III proposed awarding the Legion of Honour to Courbet, but Courbet disdainfully rejected the offer.

The term Impressionist was not coined until 1874, but during the Second Empire all the major Impressionist painters were at work in Paris, developing their own personal styles. Claude Monet exhibited two of his paintings — a landscape and a portrait of his future wife Camille Doncieux — at the Paris Salon of 1866.

A major decorative painter whose career was launched under Napoleon III was Puvis de Chavannes. He became celebrated in the Belle Époque for his murals in the Paris Panthéon, the Sorbonne, and the Hôtel de Ville, Paris.

Edgar Degas (1834–1917), the son of a banker, trained in academic painting at the École des Beaux-Arts and travelled to Italy to study the Renaissance masters. In 1868, he began to frequent the Café Guerbois, where he met Manet, Monet, Renoir, and other artists of a newer, more naturalistic school, and began to develop his own distinctive style.

== Sculpture ==
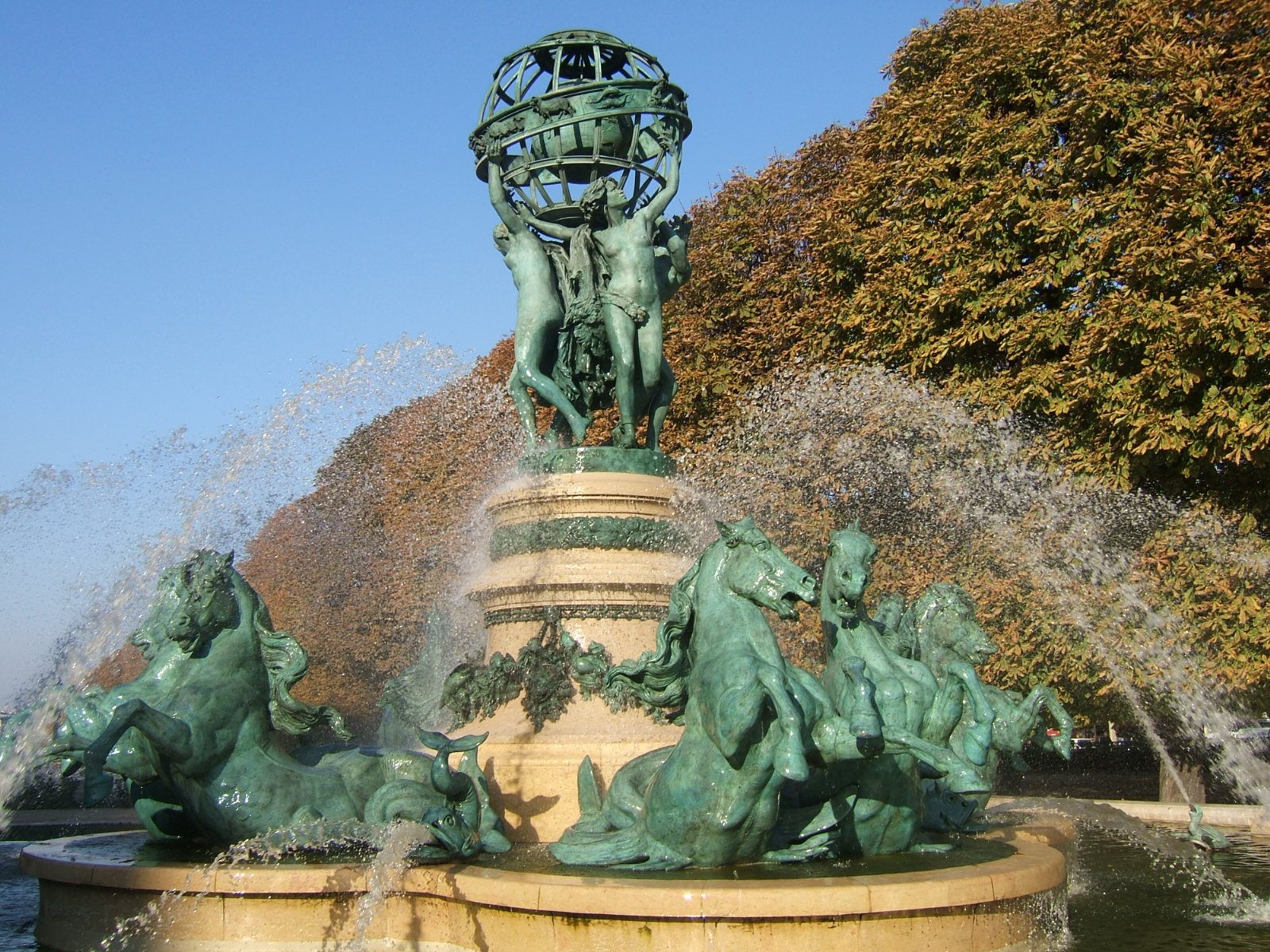
The Seasons Turning the Celestial Sphere for the Fontaine de l'Observatoire by Jean-Baptiste Carpeaux, 1868, National Museum, Warsaw

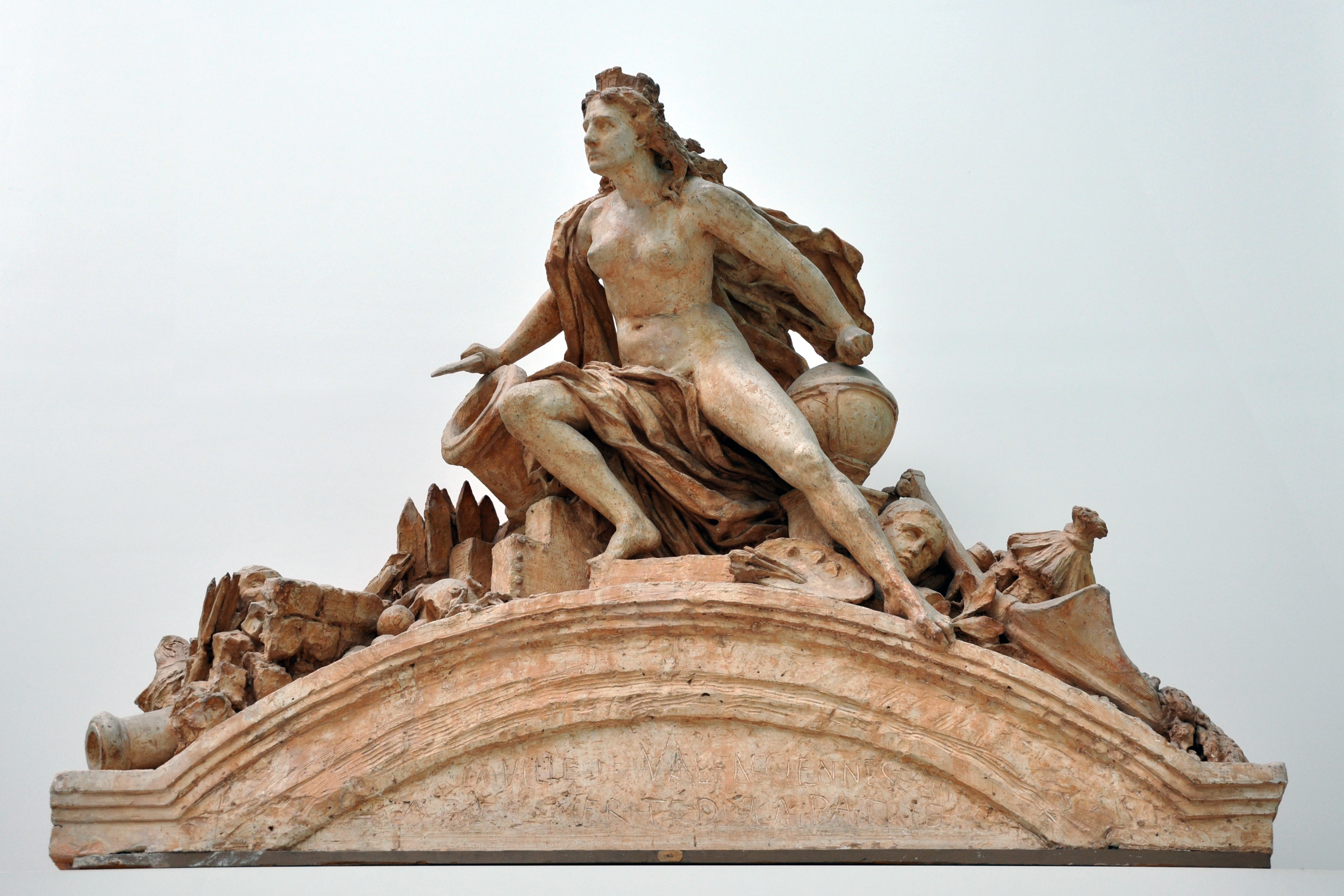
Valenciennes Defending the Arts of Peace with the Arts of War, Jean-Baptiste Carpeaux, 1869, Musée des Beaux-Arts de Valenciennes

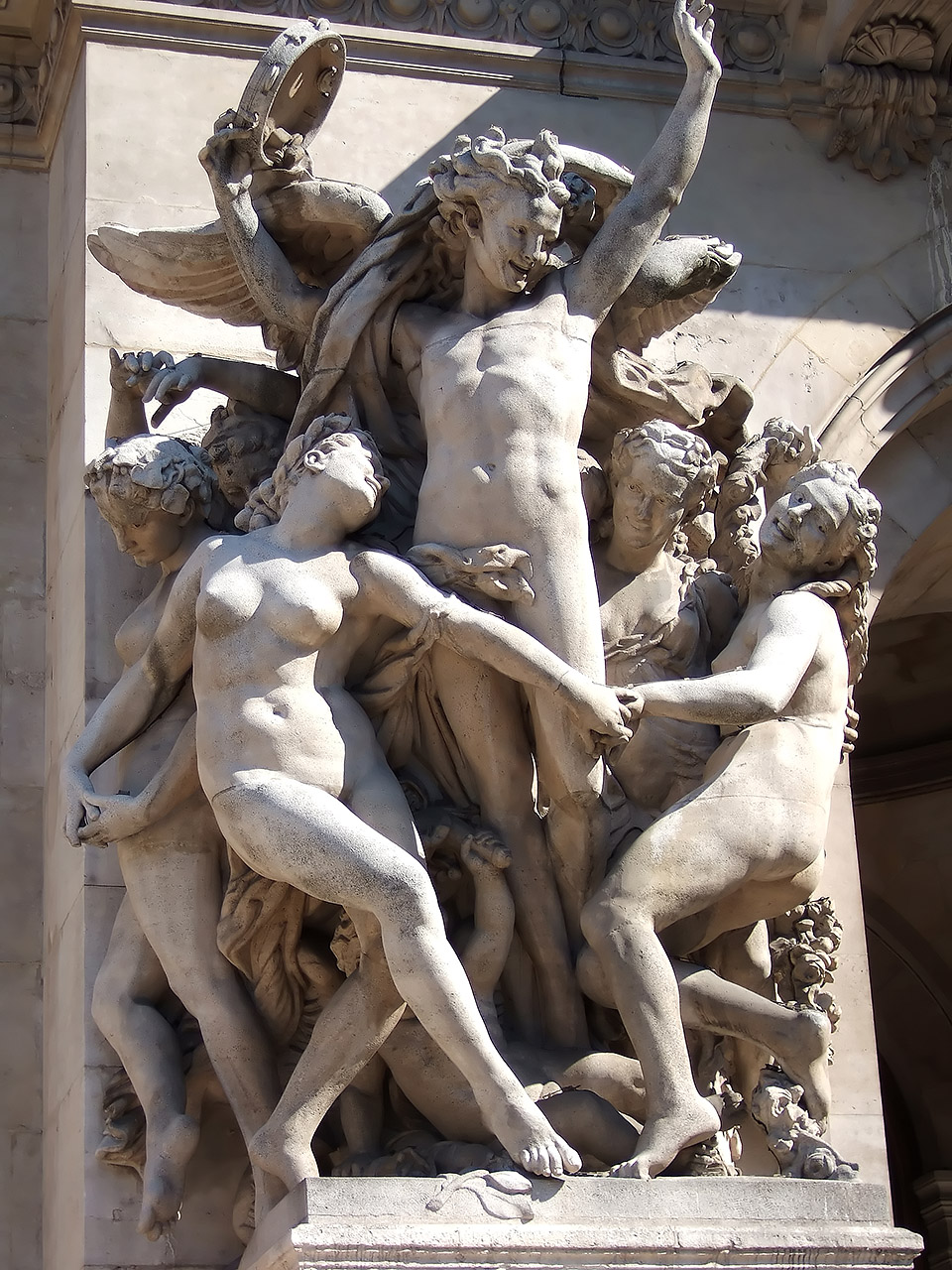
La Danse (The Dance), for the façade of the Opéra Garnier (installed 1869)

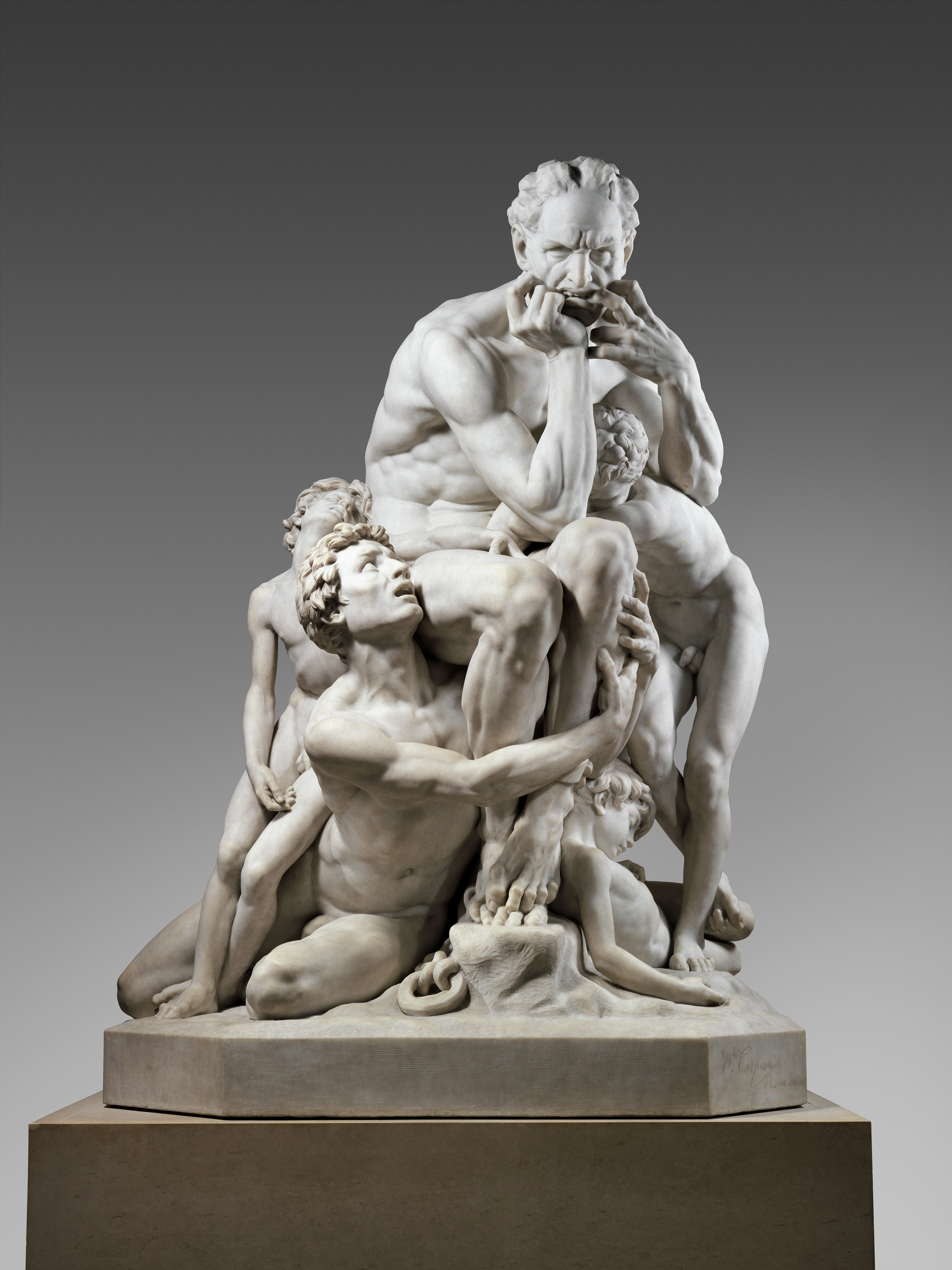
Ugolino and His Sons, Jean-Baptiste Carpeaux, 1857–60, Metropolitan Museum of Art

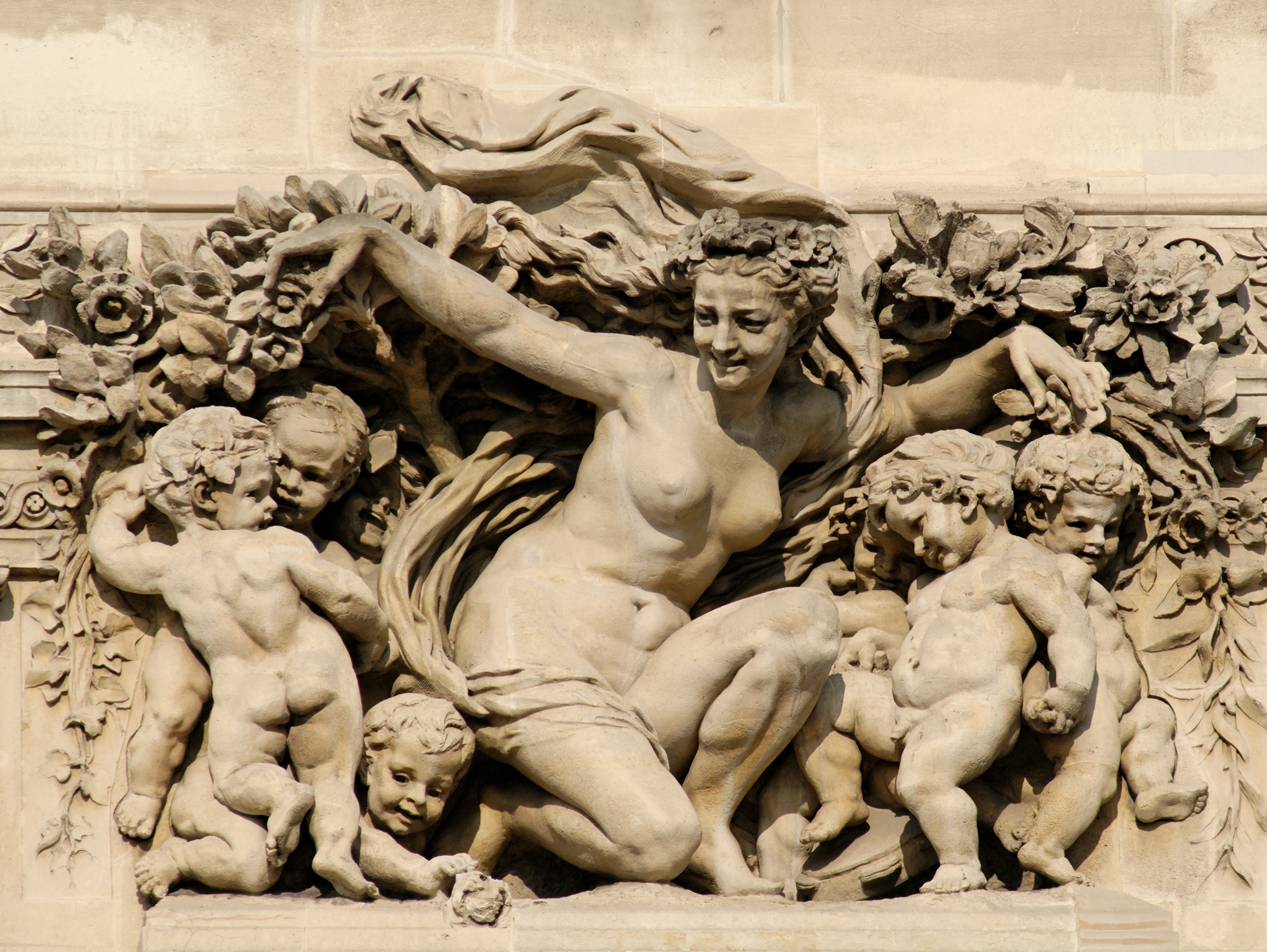
Le Triomphe de Flore (The Triumph of Flora) by Jean-Baptiste Carpeaux. South façade of the Pavillon de Flore, Louvre Palace, Paris

The most prominent sculptor of the reign of Napoleon III was Jean-Baptiste Carpeaux, who contributed to the decoration of several landmarks, including the façade of the Opéra Garnier and the new additions to the Louvre. His style complemented the historical styles of the period while remaining sufficiently original and bold to stand on its own. Born in Valenciennes, Nord, the son of a mason, he received his early training under François Rude. Carpeaux entered the École des Beaux-Arts in 1844 and won the Prix de Rome in 1854. Moving to Rome, he studied the works of Michelangelo, Donatello, and Verrocchio. His years in Rome (1854–1861) cultivated a taste for movement and spontaneity that he fused with the great principles of Baroque art, leading him to seek subjects from real life and to break with the classical tradition.

His sculpture La Danse for the façade of the Paris Opera (1869) caused a scandal upon its installation owing to the flamboyant poses of the nude figures.

A young sculptor, Auguste Rodin, attempted to establish himself in the profession during the Second Empire without success; he applied three times to the École des Beaux-Arts and was rejected on each occasion.

== Music ==
Jacques Offenbach by Nadar (1860s)

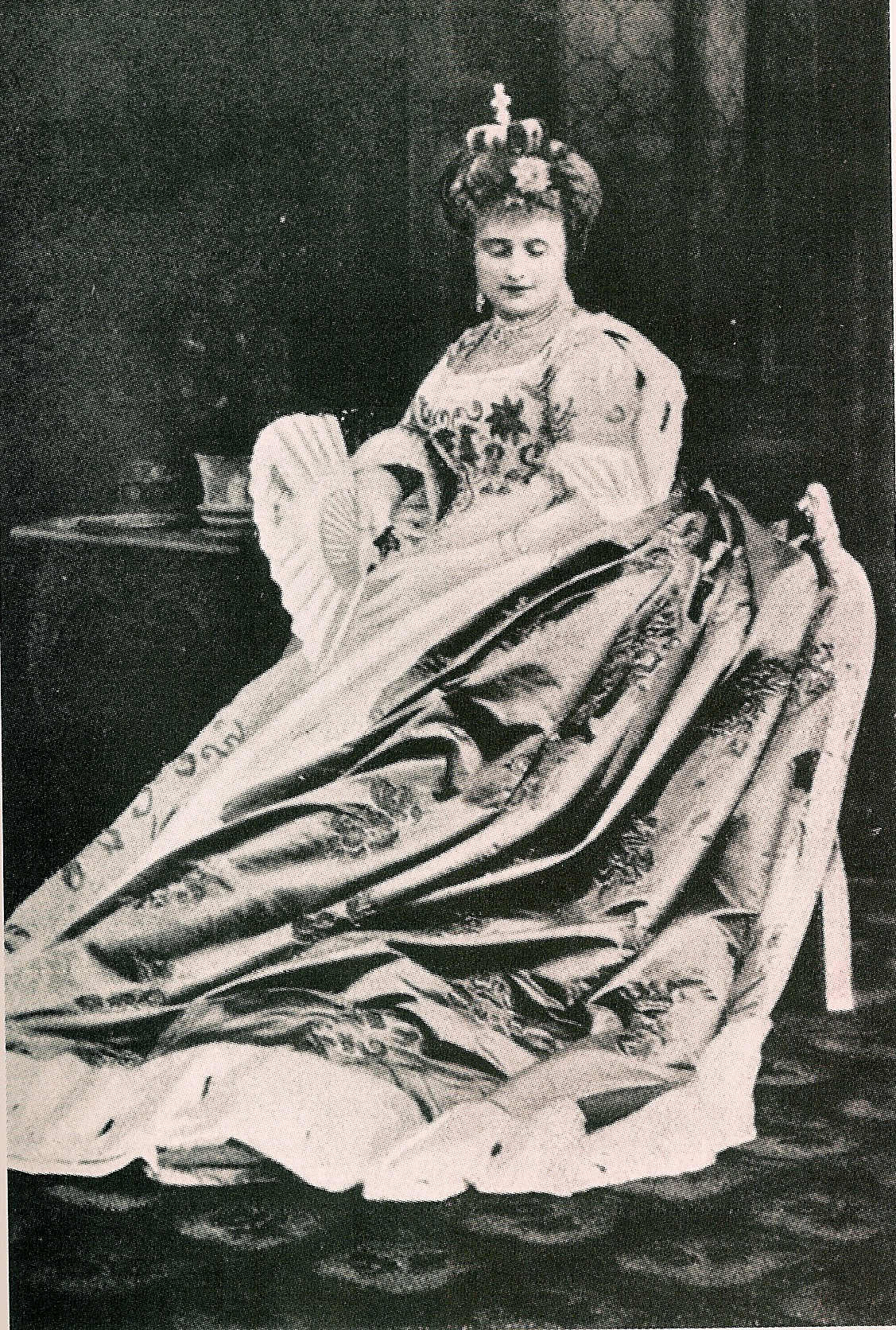
Hortense Schneider as la Grande-Duchesse de Gérolstein (1867)

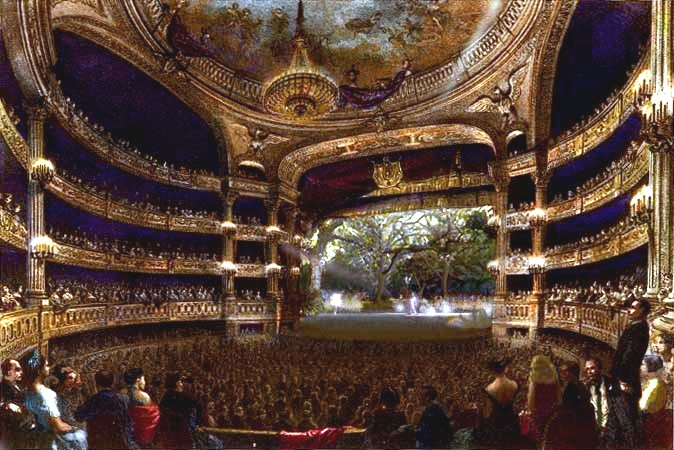
The old Paris Opera on Rue Pelletier (1864)

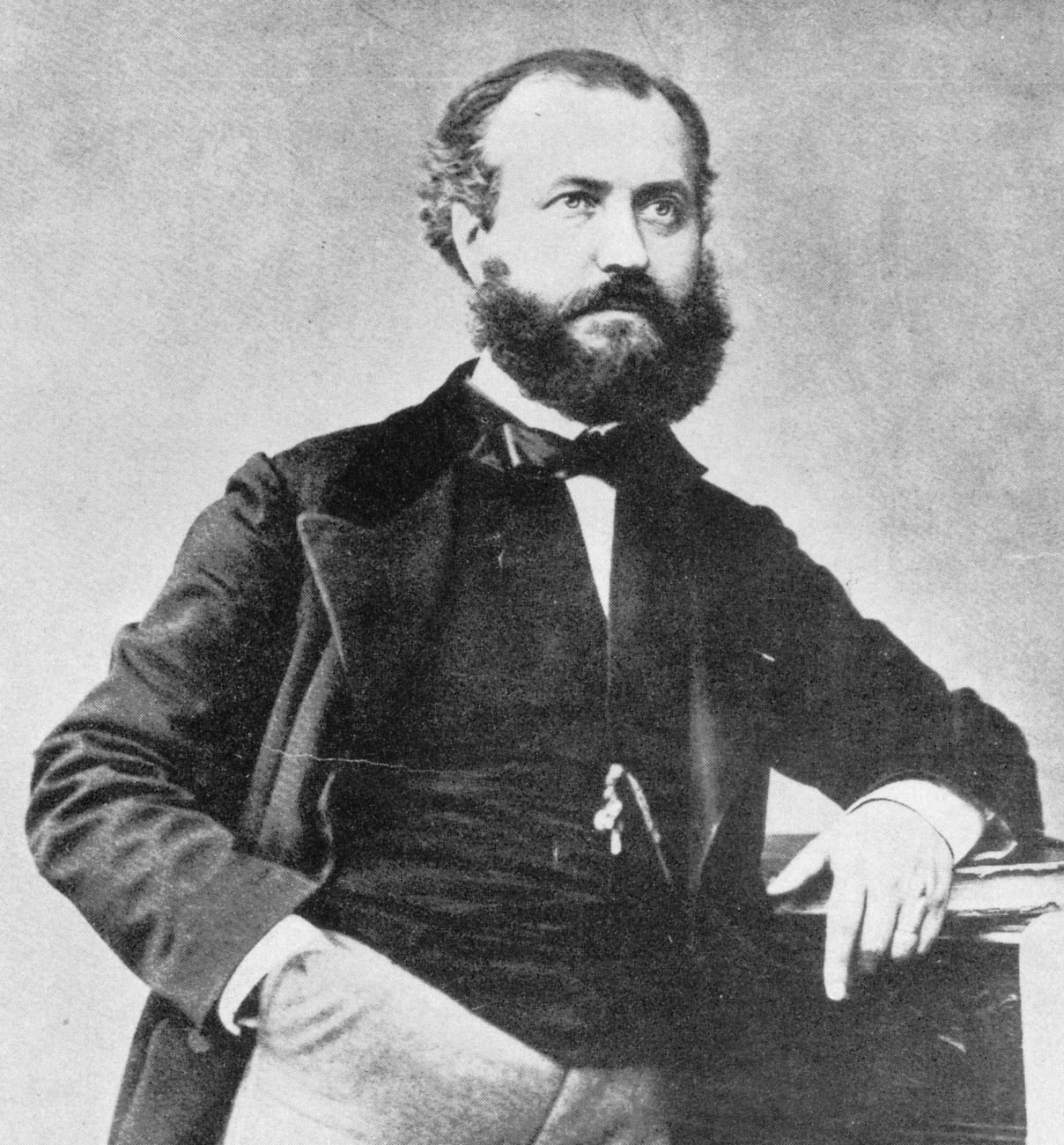
Charles Gounod (1859)

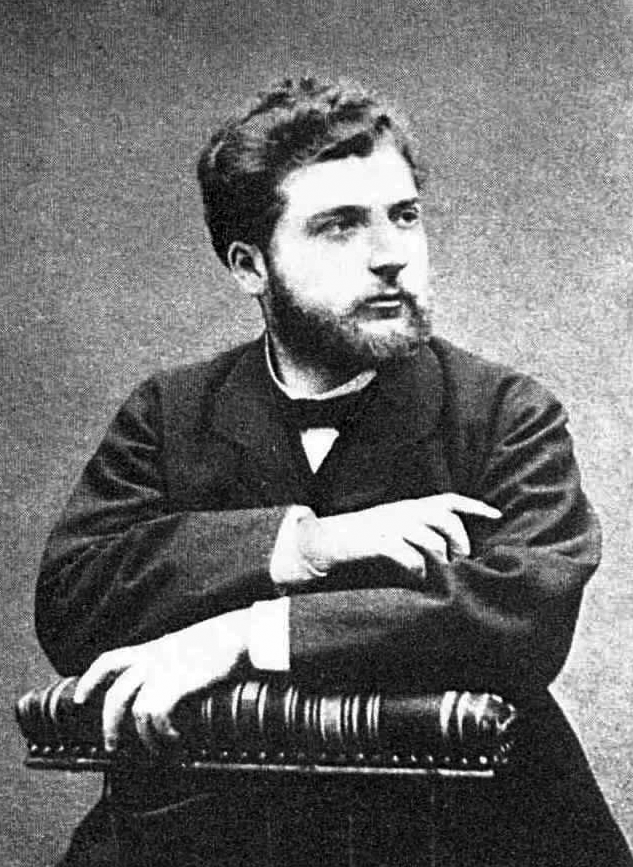
Georges Bizet (c. 1860)

=== The operetta ===
Under Napoleon III, a new and lighter musical genre, the operetta, was born in Paris and flourished above all in the work of Jacques Offenbach. It emerged not from classical opera but from comic opera and vaudeville, which were enormously popular at the time. Its characteristics included a light subject matter, an abundance of comedy, spoken dialogue interspersed with songs, and lively instrumental music. The earliest works were staged in 1848 by Auguste Florimond Ronger, better known as Hervé.

The works of Hervé included Latrouillatt and Truffaldini, or the Inconveniences of a Vendetta Infinitely Prolonged Too Long and Agamemnon, or the Camel with Two Humps. The early works were limited to two performers on stage at a time and were usually no longer than a single act. After 1858, they became longer and more elaborate, with larger casts and several acts, and were designated first opéras bouffes and then operettas. Hervé opened his own theatre, the Folies Concertantes on the Boulevard du Temple, the main theatre district of Paris, and productions were also staged at other theatres around the city.

A new composer, Jacques Offenbach, soon emerged to challenge Hervé. Born in Germany, Offenbach was first a cellist with the orchestra of the Opéra-Comique, then conductor of the orchestra for the Comédie-Française, composing music performed between the acts. In 1853, he wrote a short musical scene for performance between acts, then a more ambitious short comedy, Pepito, for the Théâtre des Variétés. Unable to have his work performed in the major theatres, he tried a different approach. In 1855, taking advantage of the first Paris Universal Exposition, which brought enormous crowds to the city, he rented a theatre on the Champs-Élysées and performed his works to full houses.

He then opened a new theatre, the Bouffes-Parisiens, which debuted in 1855 with Ba-ta-clan, a Chinese-style Musical. Offenbach's theatre attracted not only the working and middle classes, the traditional audiences of the music halls, but also the upper classes. Comic opera scenes alternated with musical interludes by Rossini, Mozart, and Pergolesi. In 1858 he took a further step with his first full-length operetta, in four acts with a chorus, Orpheus in the Underworld. It was a popular and critical triumph, running for two hundred and twenty-eight nights. Following the final performance, Napoleon III granted Offenbach French citizenship, and his name formally changed from Jacob to Jacques.

=== Verdi and Wagner ===
Grand opera and other musical genres also flourished under Napoleon III. The expansion of Paris railway stations brought thousands of tourists from across France and Europe to the city, increasing demand for music and entertainment. Operas and musicals could play to larger audiences and run for much longer. The old theatres on the "Boulevard of Crime" were demolished to make way for a new boulevard, but larger new theatres were constructed in the city centre. Verdi signed a contract in 1852 to create a new work for the Paris Opera in collaboration with Eugène Scribe. The result was Les vêpres siciliennes. Verdi complained that the Paris orchestra and chorus were unruly and undisciplined, and rehearsed them an unprecedented one hundred and sixty-one times before he considered them ready.

His work was rewarded: the opera was a critical and popular success, receiving one hundred and fifty performances rather than the originally proposed forty. He was nevertheless dissatisfied that his operas attracted less success in Paris than those of his principal rival, Meyerbeer; he returned to Italy and did not come back for several years. He was eventually persuaded to return to stage Don Carlos, commissioned expressly for the Paris Opera. Once again he encountered difficulties — one singer took him to court over casting, and rivalries between other performers poisoned the production. He later wrote: "I am not a composer for Paris. I believe in inspiration; others only care about how the pieces are put together."

Napoleon III intervened personally to bring Richard Wagner back to Paris; Wagner rehearsed the orchestra sixty-three times for the first French production of Tannhäuser on 13 March 1861. Wagner proved unpopular with both French critics and members of the Jockey Club, an influential Parisian social society. During the premiere, with Wagner in the audience, Jockey Club members whistled and jeered from the opening notes of the overture. After only three performances, the opera was withdrawn from the repertoire. Wagner had his revenge in 1870, when the Prussian Army captured Napoleon III and besieged Paris; he composed a special piece of music to mark the occasion, "Ode to the German Army at Paris".

During the Second Empire, before the completion of the Opéra Garnier, Paris had three major opera houses: the Salle Le Pelletier, where the Emperor narrowly escaped a terrorist bomb in 1858; the Théâtre Lyrique; and Les Italiens, which presented only Italian works in Italian. The leading French composers of the period included Charles Gounod, Hector Berlioz, Félicien David, and Gabriel Fauré.

=== The new French opera: Gounod and Bizet ===
While Verdi and Wagner attracted the greatest public attention, younger French composers were also striving to make their mark. Charles Gounod wrote his first opera, Sapho, in 1851 at the urging of his friend, the singer Pauline Viardot; it was a commercial failure. He achieved no significant theatrical success until Faust, derived from Goethe, which premiered at the Théâtre Lyrique in 1859. This remains the work for which he is best remembered; though it took time to achieve popularity, it eventually became one of the most frequently staged operas of all time, with no fewer than 2,000 performances at the Paris Opéra alone by 1975.

Georges Bizet wrote his first opera, Les pêcheurs de perles, for the Théâtre Lyrique company. It received its first performance on 30 September 1863. Critical opinion was generally hostile, though Berlioz praised the work, writing that it "does M. Bizet the greatest honour". Public reaction was lukewarm, and the run ended after 18 performances; the opera was not revived until 1886. Bizet did not achieve major success until Carmen in 1875. He died after the thirty-third performance. Carmen went on to become one of the most performed operas of all time.

=== Popular music ===
Musical styles popular among the broader public also evolved under Napoleon III. The café-concert was a Parisian institution, with at least one in every neighbourhood. These establishments ranged from a single singer accompanied by a piano to elegant cafés with full orchestras. A city ordinance, designed to protect the traditional musical theatres, forbade performers in cafés from wearing costumes, dancing, using mime, or employing sets or scenery; they were also forbidden to sing more than forty songs in an evening and were required to submit the programme in advance each day. This law was challenged by one café-concert proprietor, who engaged a former actress of the Comédie-Française to perform scenes from classic plays in costume. The law was revised in 1867, opening the way to an entirely new institution in Paris: the music hall, with comedy, sets, and costumed singers and dancers. For the first time, the profession of singer was accorded formal status, and composers could seek royalties for the performance of their compositions.

== See also ==
- Beaux-Arts architecture – Neoclassical architectural style
- Paris during the Second Empire

== General and cited references ==
- "Second Empire style" (2008). In Encyclopædia Britannica. Retrieved 1 June 2008, from Encyclopædia Britannica Online
- Dean, Winton (1980). "Bizet, Georges (Alexandre César Léopold)". In Sadie, Stanley (ed.). New Grove Dictionary of Music and Musicians. Vol. 2. London: Macmillan. ISBN 0-333-23111-2.
- De Morant, Henry (1970). Histoire des arts décoratifs. Librairie Hachette.
- Ducher, Robert (1988). Caractéristique des Styles. Paris: Flammarion. ISBN 2-08-011539-1.
- Fierro, Alfred (1996). Histoire et dictionnaire de Paris. Robert Laffont. ISBN 2-221-07862-4.
- Héron de Villefosse, René (1959). Histoire de Paris. Bernard Grasset.
- Jover, Manuel (2005). Ingres (in French). Paris: Terrail/Édigroup. ISBN 2-87939-287-X.
- Maneglier, Hervé (1990). Paris Impérial — La vie quotidienne sous le Second Empire (in French). Paris: Armand Colin. ISBN 2-200-37226-4.
- Prina, Francesca; Demartini, Elena (2006). Petite encyclopédie de l'architecture. Paris: Solar. ISBN 2-263-04096-X.
- Hopkins, Owen (2014). Les styles en architecture. Dunod. ISBN 978-2-10-070689-1.
- Renault, Christophe (2006). Les Styles de l'architecture et du mobilier. Paris: Gisserot. ISBN 978-2-87747-465-8.
- Riley, Noël (2004). Grammaire des Arts Décoratifs de la Renaissance au Post-Modernisme. Flammarion. ISBN 978-2-08-011327-6.
- Sarmant, Thierry (2012). Histoire de Paris: Politique, urbanisme, civilisation. Editions Jean-Paul Gisserot. ISBN 978-2-7558-0330-3.
- Texier, Simon (2012). Paris — Panorama de l'architecture de l'Antiquité à nos jours. Paris: Parigramme. ISBN 978-2-84096-667-8.
- Toman, Rolf (2007). Néoclassicisme et Romantisme: architecture, sculpture, peinture, dessin (in French). Ullmann. ISBN 978-3-8331-3557-6.
- Dictionnaire Historique de Paris. Le Livre de Poche. 2013. ISBN 978-2-253-13140-3.
- Vila, Marie Christine (2007). Paris Musique de l'école de Notre-Dame à la Cité de la musique: Huit Siècles d'histoire. Paris: Parigramme. ISBN 978-2-84096-419-3.
