= Saint-Jean-Baptiste de Belleville =

Saint-Jean-Baptiste Church of Belleville
- Église Saint-Jean-Baptiste de Belleville
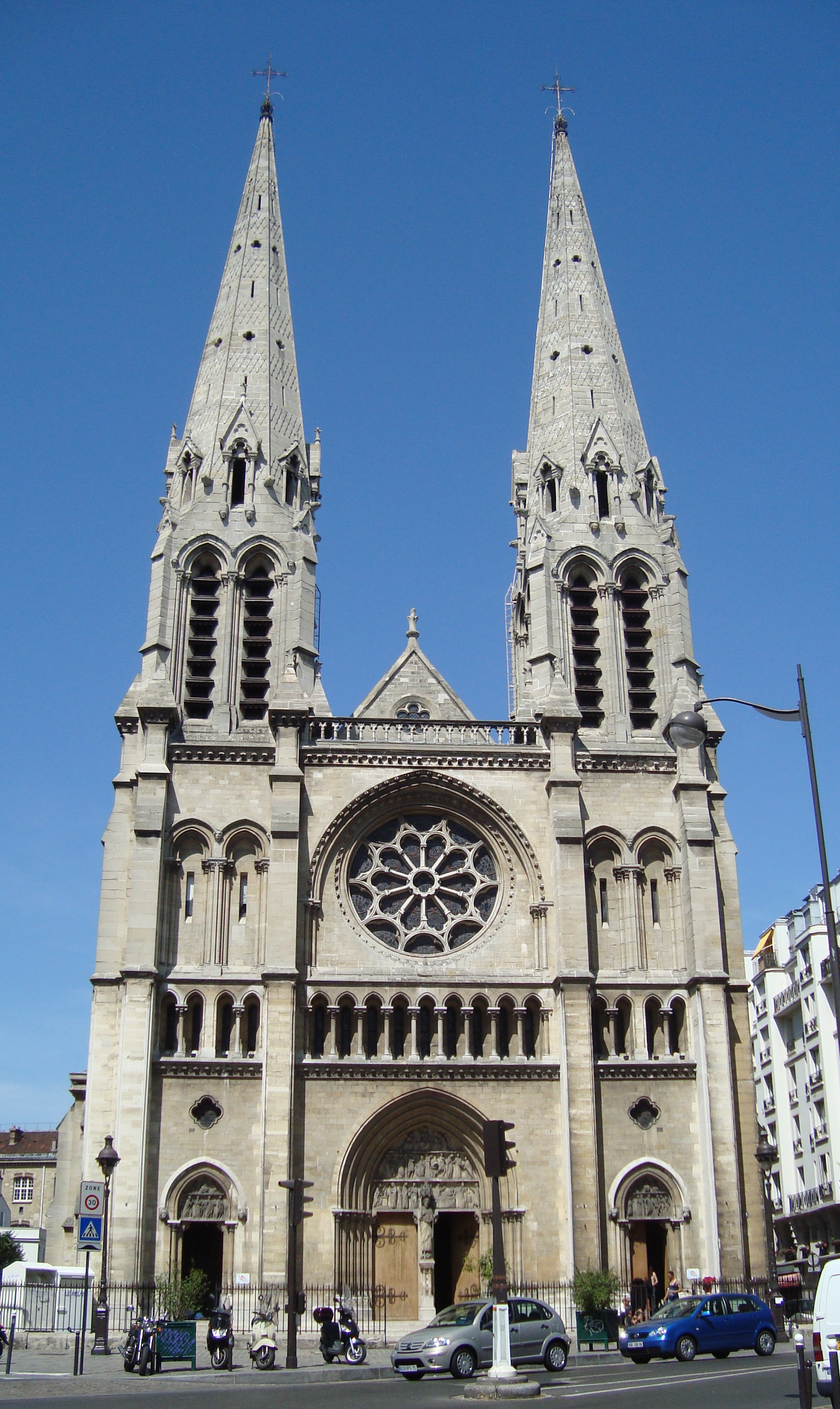
- Saint-Jean-Baptiste Church of Belleville
- 48°52′32.5″N 2°23′21.4″E
- Location: 19th arrondissement of Paris
- Address: 139 Rue de Belleville, 75019 Paris, France
- Country: France
- Denomination: Roman Catholic

Architecture
- Style: Neo-Gothic
- Groundbreaking: 1854
- Completed: 1859

Administration
- Archdiocese: Paris

Clergy
- Priest: Christian Mahéas

Saint-Jean-Baptiste de Belleville, is a Roman Catholic church located at 139 rue de Belleville in the 19th arrondissement of Paris. It is a notable example of 19th-century Neo-Gothic architecture in Paris. It was begun in 1854 by architect Jean-Baptiste Lassus (1806–1857), a leading proponent of the Neo-Gothic style in Paris, and was his final and most accomplished work. It was completed after his death by his student Truchy.

The French architect and historian Eugène Viollet-le-Duc wrote of the church: “Lassus displayed great erudition, taste, and even put a certain original character into this large-scale study of the architecture of the 13th century.”

This site is served by the Jourdain Metro Station.

== History ==
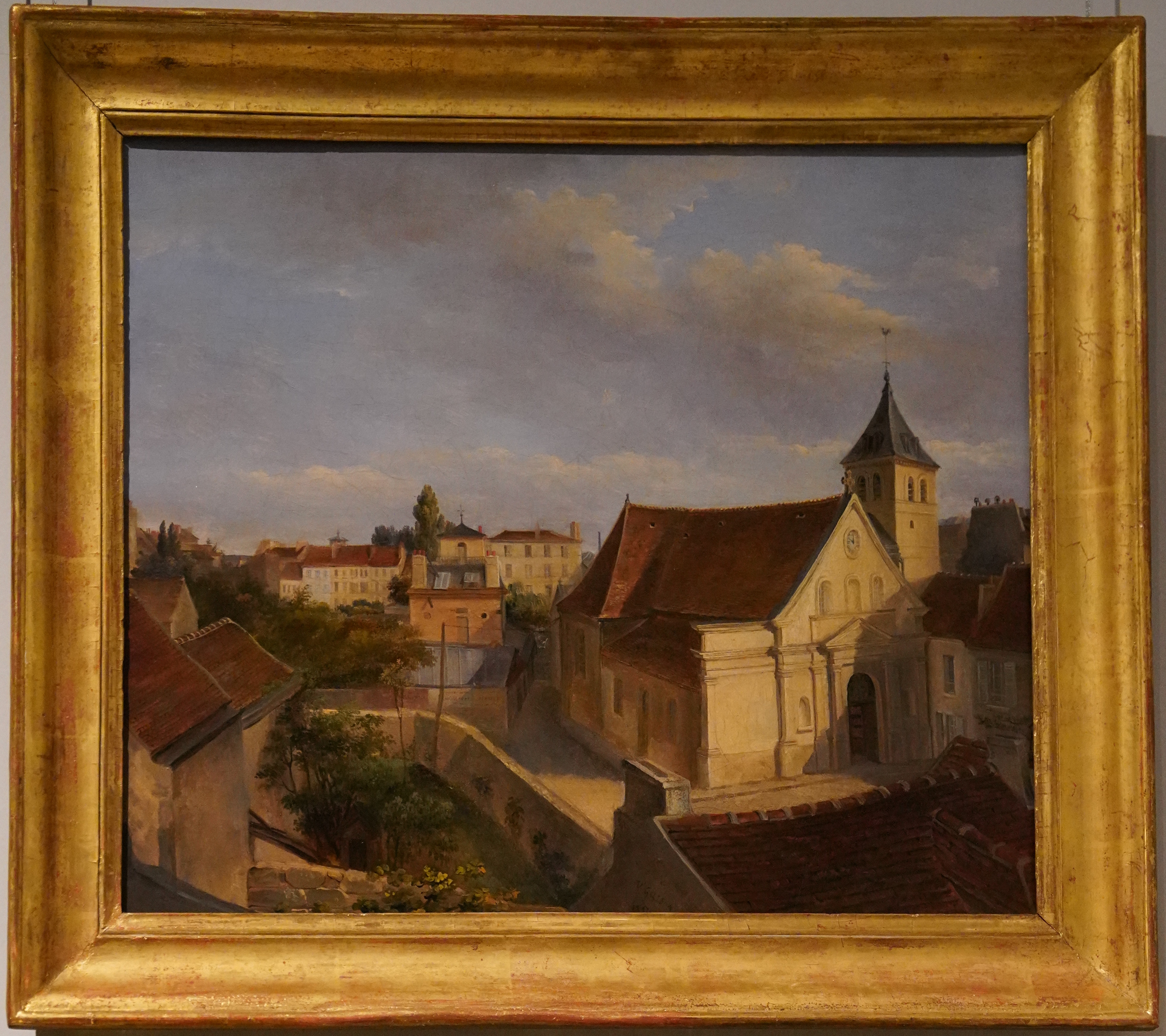
The earlier church in 1852

At the time the first church was constructed, it was just outside of Paris, in a village called Belleville-sur-Sablon, surrounded by farms, vineyards, and the country residences of wealthy Parisians. The parish had an earlier chapel built in 1548 and larger chapel built in 1635.

In its first years the church was under the authority of the vicar of the Saint Merry de Paris parish. The autonomous parish was officially created on May 15, 1802, the date of reorganization of the parishes of the Paris suburbs. It formally became a Parisian parish in 1860, following the annexation of Belleville into Paris under Emperor Napoleon III.

The architect chosen to build the new church, Jean-Baptiste Lassus, was the chief architect for the restoration of major Gothic monuments, including Notre-Dame de Paris and Saint-Chapelle. He used his experience with to recapture the majesty of these earlier models, designing every detail, including the furniture.

== Exterior ==
The church measures 68 meters in overall length by 25 meters in width. The elevation of the facade to the ridge is 26 meters, the height of each spire is 57 meters, and the vault heights are 19 meters for the large nave, and 8 meters for the lower sides. Lassus designed every detail, down to the door hinges.

The facade of the church on rue du Jourdain, following the Gothic model, features three portals, a rose window and two bell towers, with identical spires, A statue of John the Baptist decorates the central portal. In the tympanum of the central portal is a bas-relief sculpture of the Holy Father surrounded by angels, beneath scenes from the life of John the Baptist. The sculpture is the work of Aime-Napoleon Perry (1813–1853)

Above the doors are two stained glass windows: King David and Saint Cecilia, and a rose window depicting the Virgin Mary in heaven.

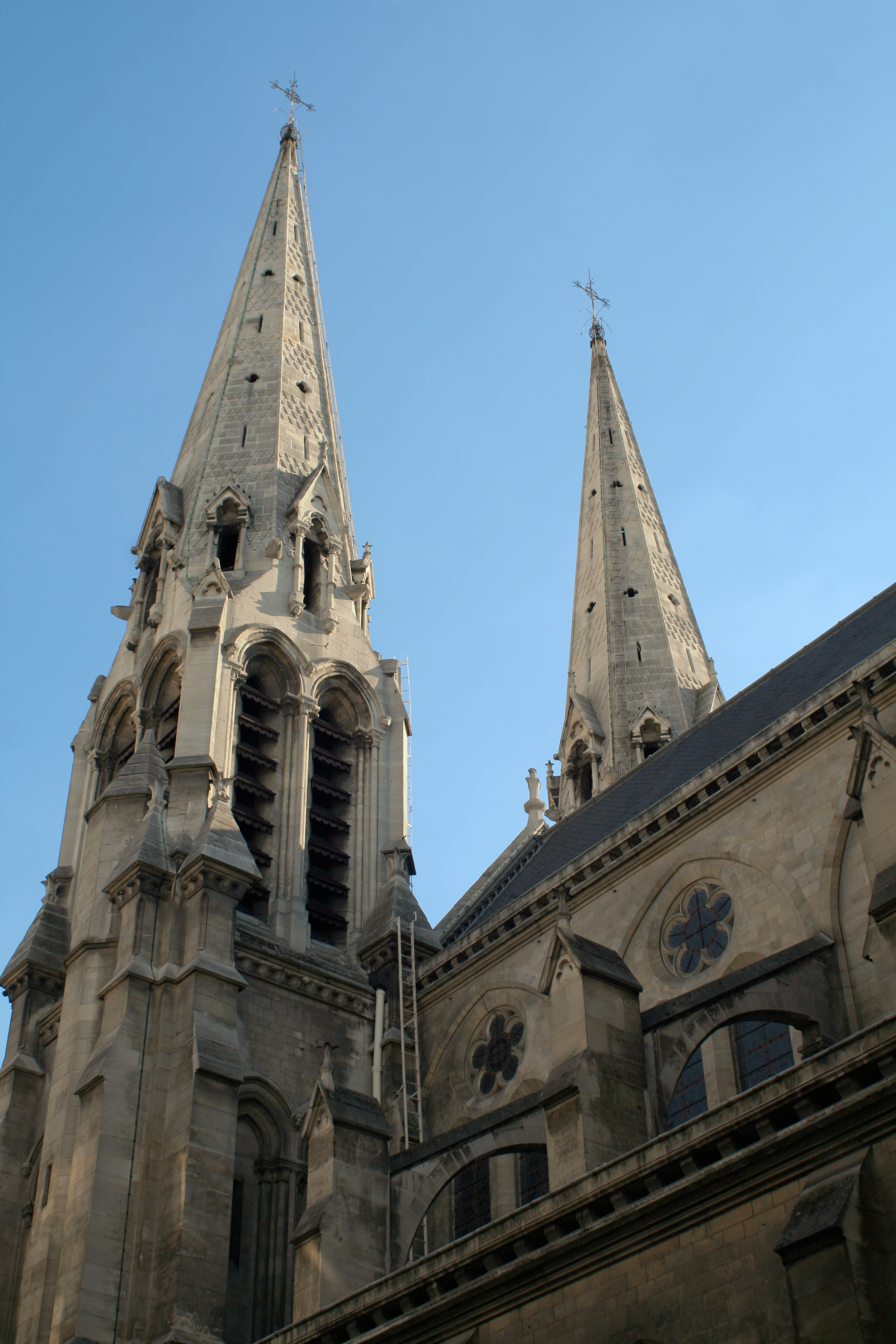
The bell towers

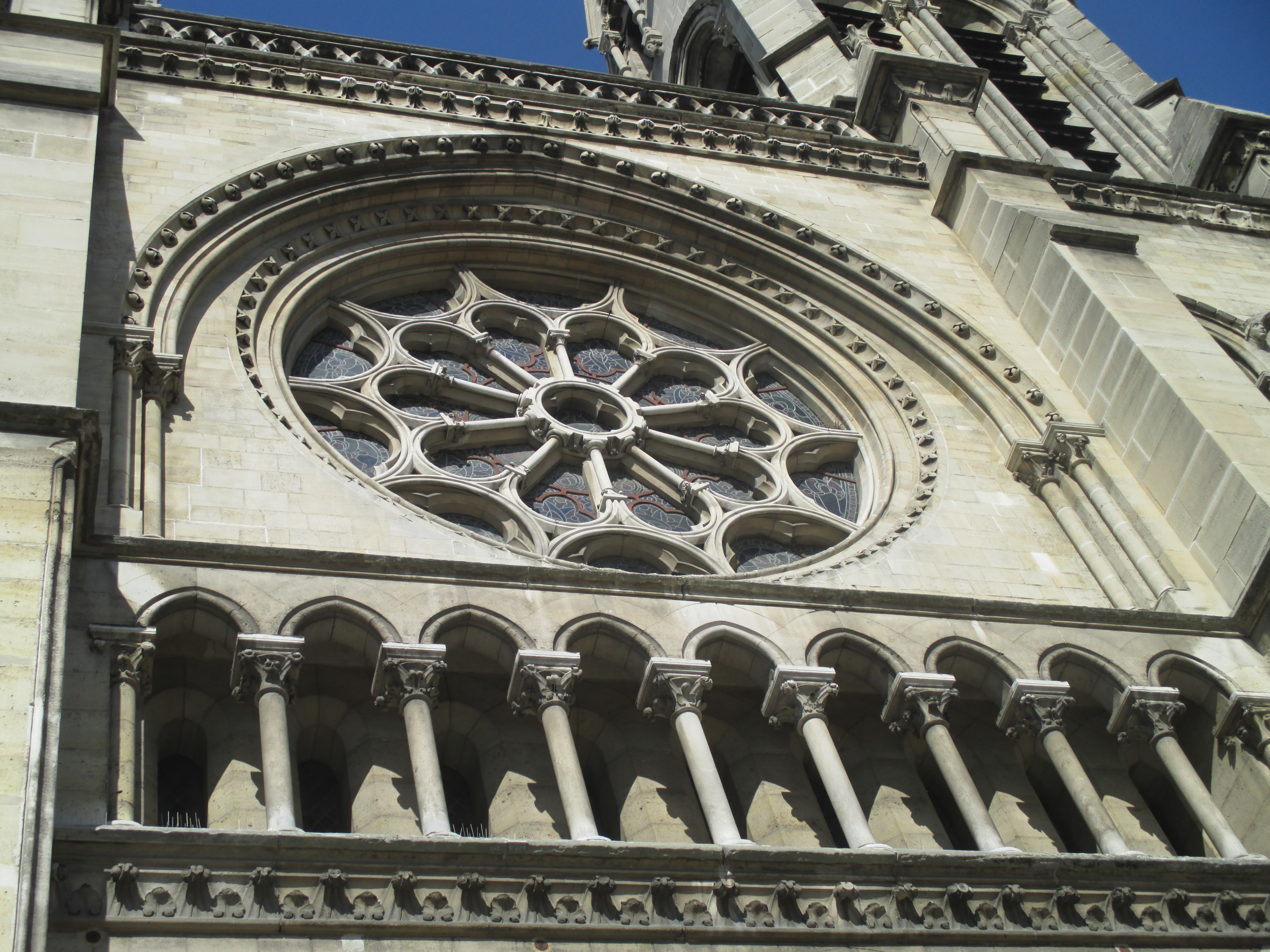
The rose window

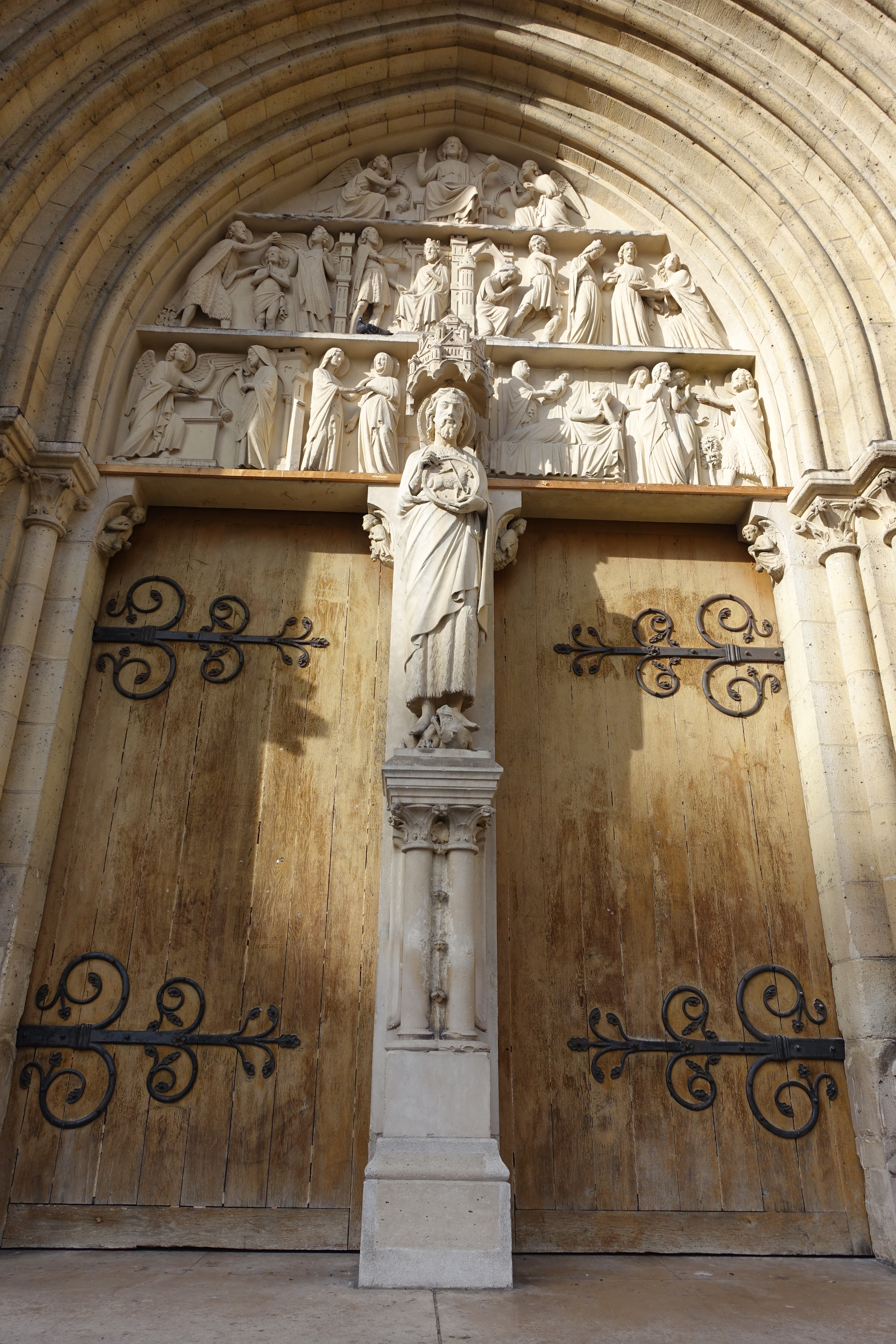
The central portal and sculpture of Saint John the Baptist

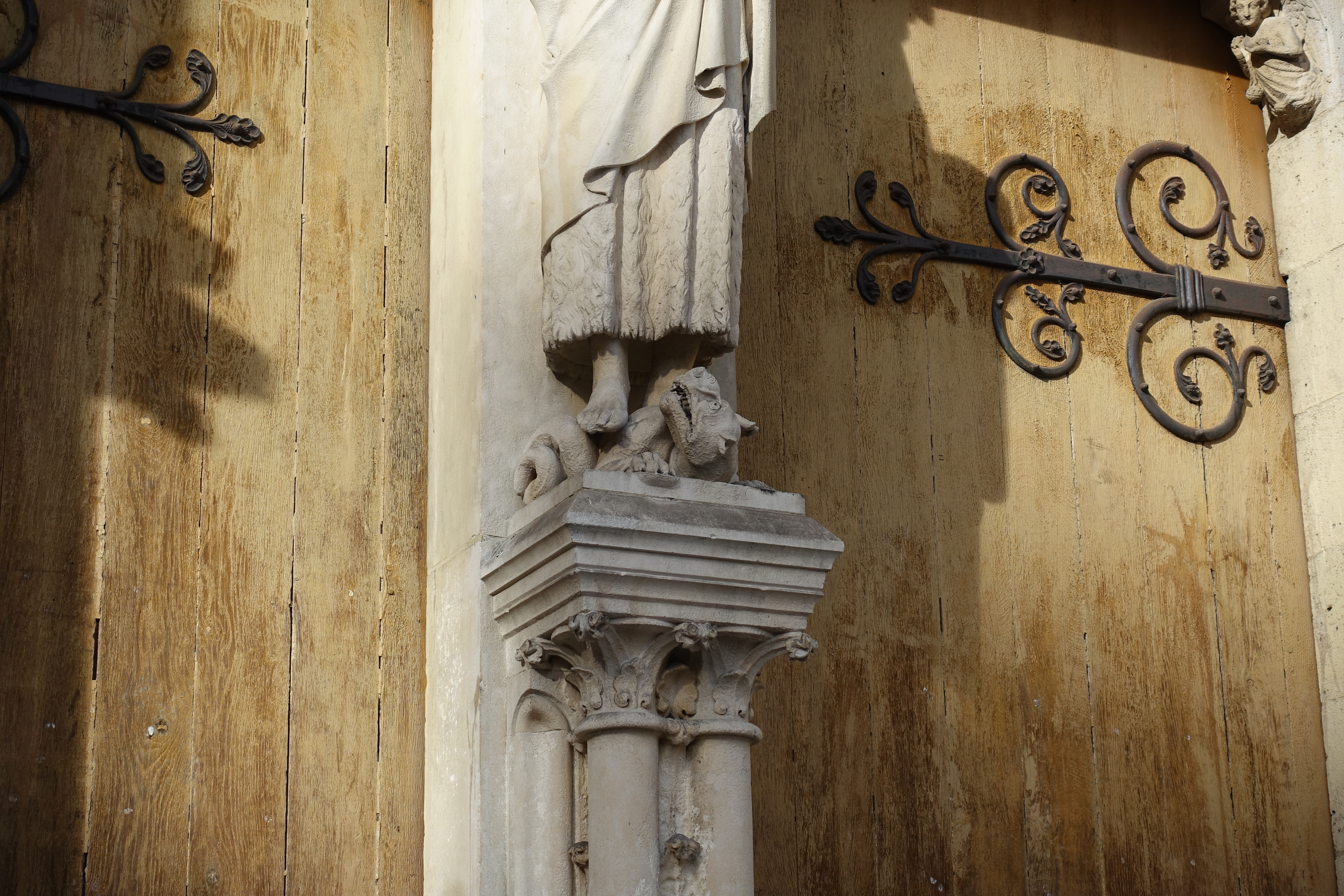
The Saint stepping on a devil

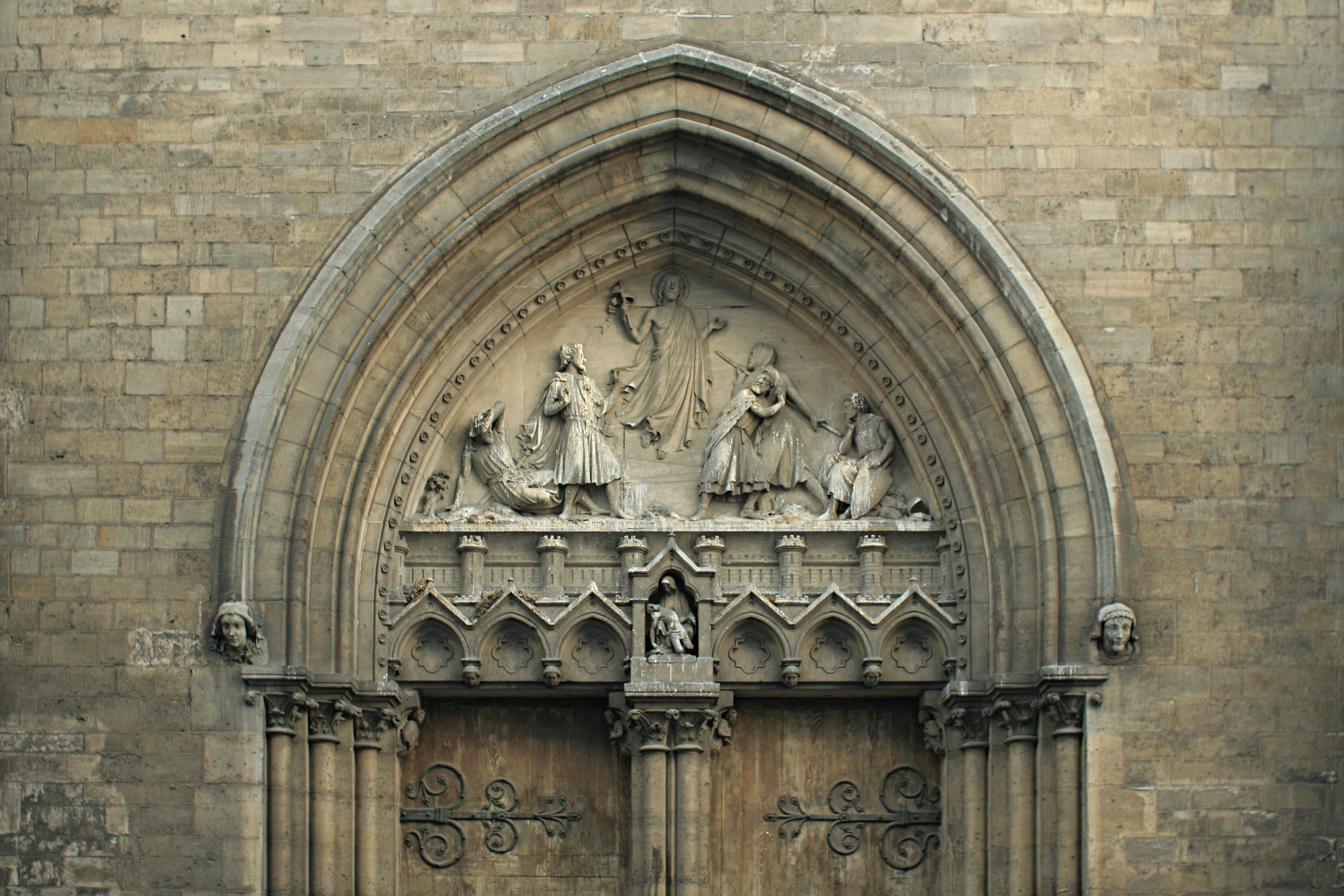
The Resurrection of Christ (Transept tympanum)

The tympanums of the left and right portals are also decorated with sculpture. The Tympanum of the left portal (alongside rue Lassus) depicts François Nicolas Madeleine Morlot, Archbishop of Paris presenting the Church of Belleville to Saint John the Baptist. The right portal, along rue de Palestine, depicts the Resurrection of Christ.

== Interior ==
The interior faithfully recreates the features of French Gothic cathedrals; a large nave lined by pointed arches; multi-lobed pillars with sculpted capitals; ribs crisscrossing the vaults, large stained windows at the top level; a disambulatory behind the choir, and a chapel dedicated to the Virgin Mary in the apse. To emphasize the height of the nave, Lassus did not interrupt the walls with a cornice. The triforium was replaced with a series of small rose windows. In the nave and the choir, the slender columns are decorated with sculpted heads, including Biblical kings and queens, and also the heads of local donors who contributed the construction of the church.

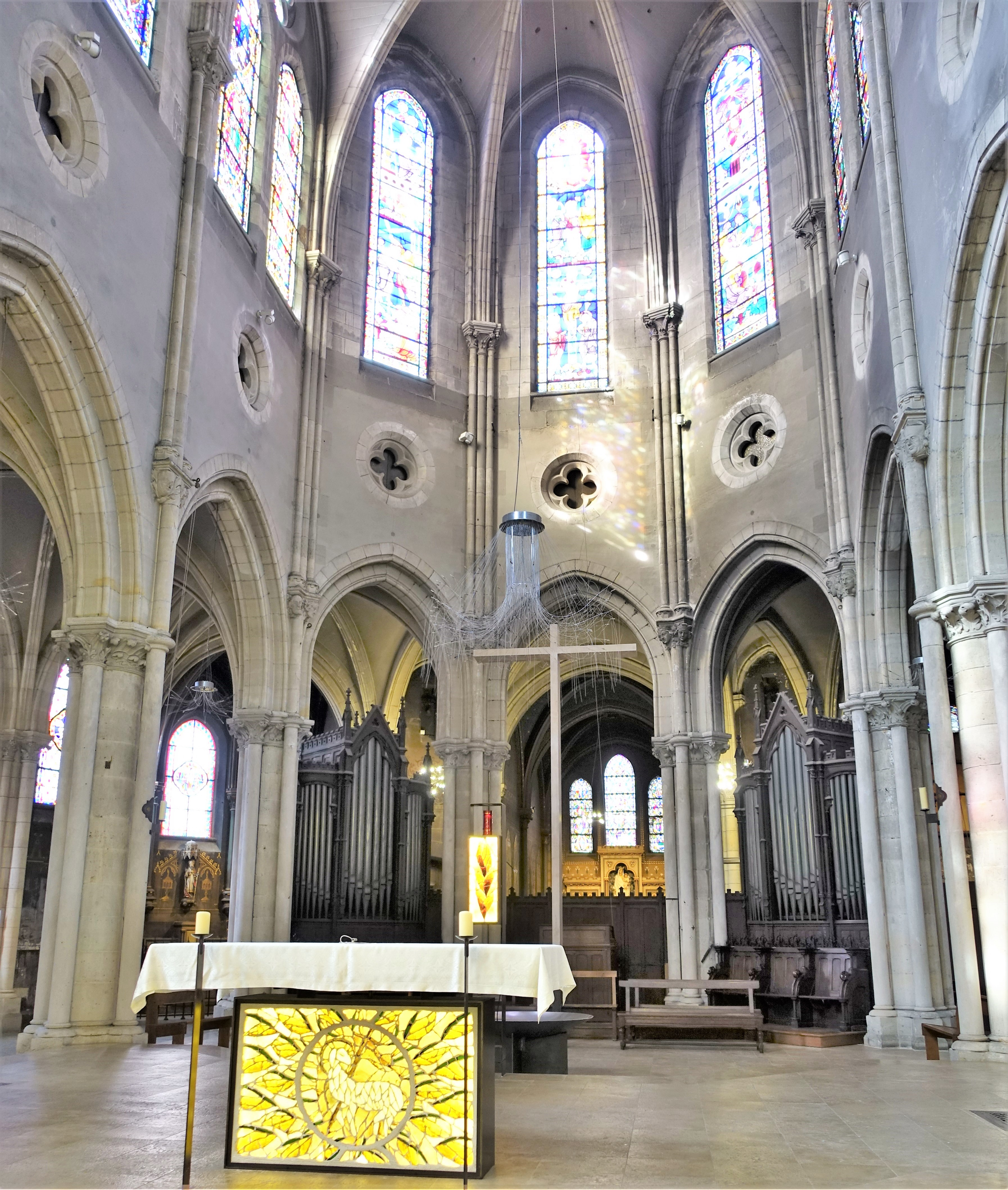
The Choir and altar. The Chapel of the Virgin is visible in the apse.

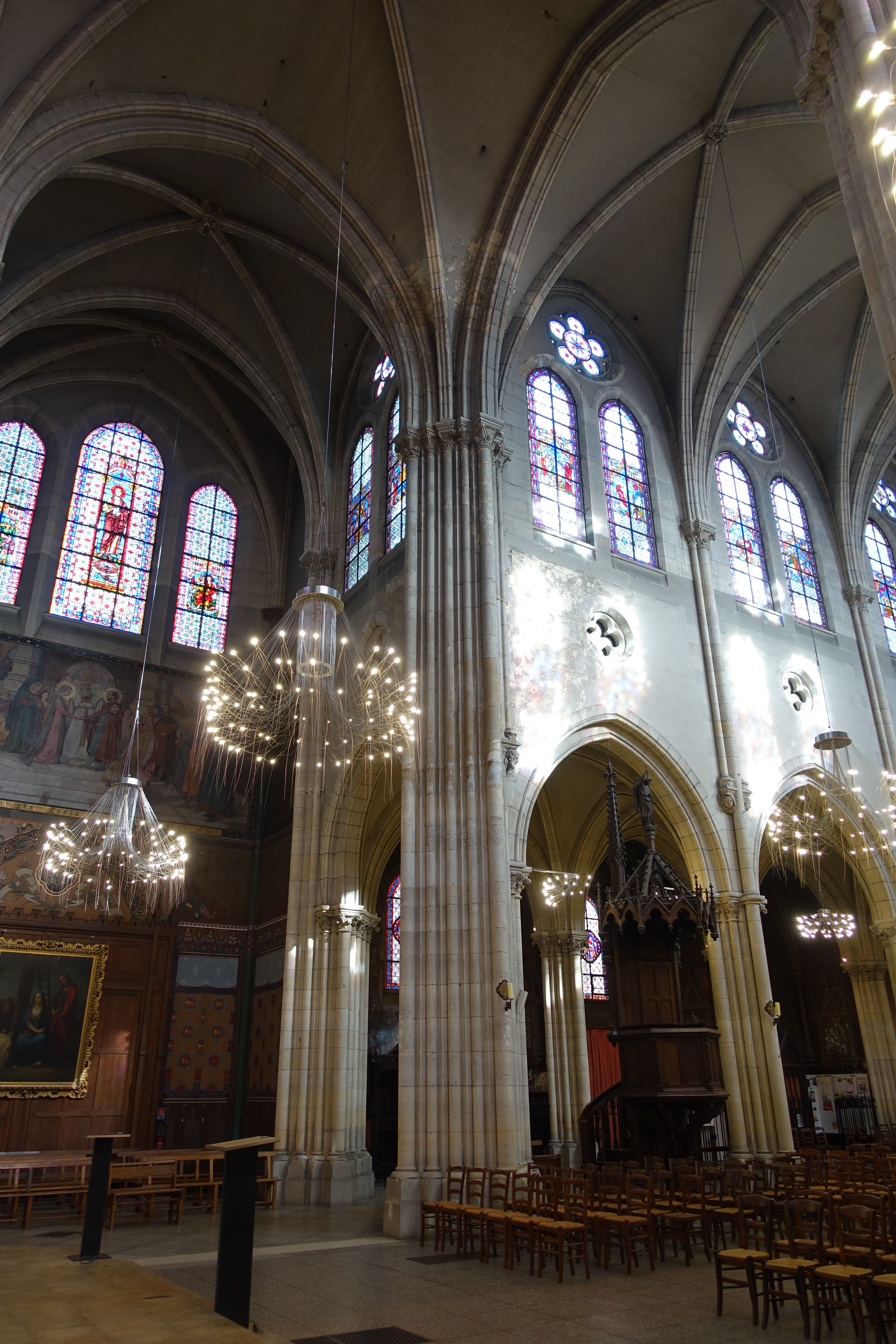
The north transept

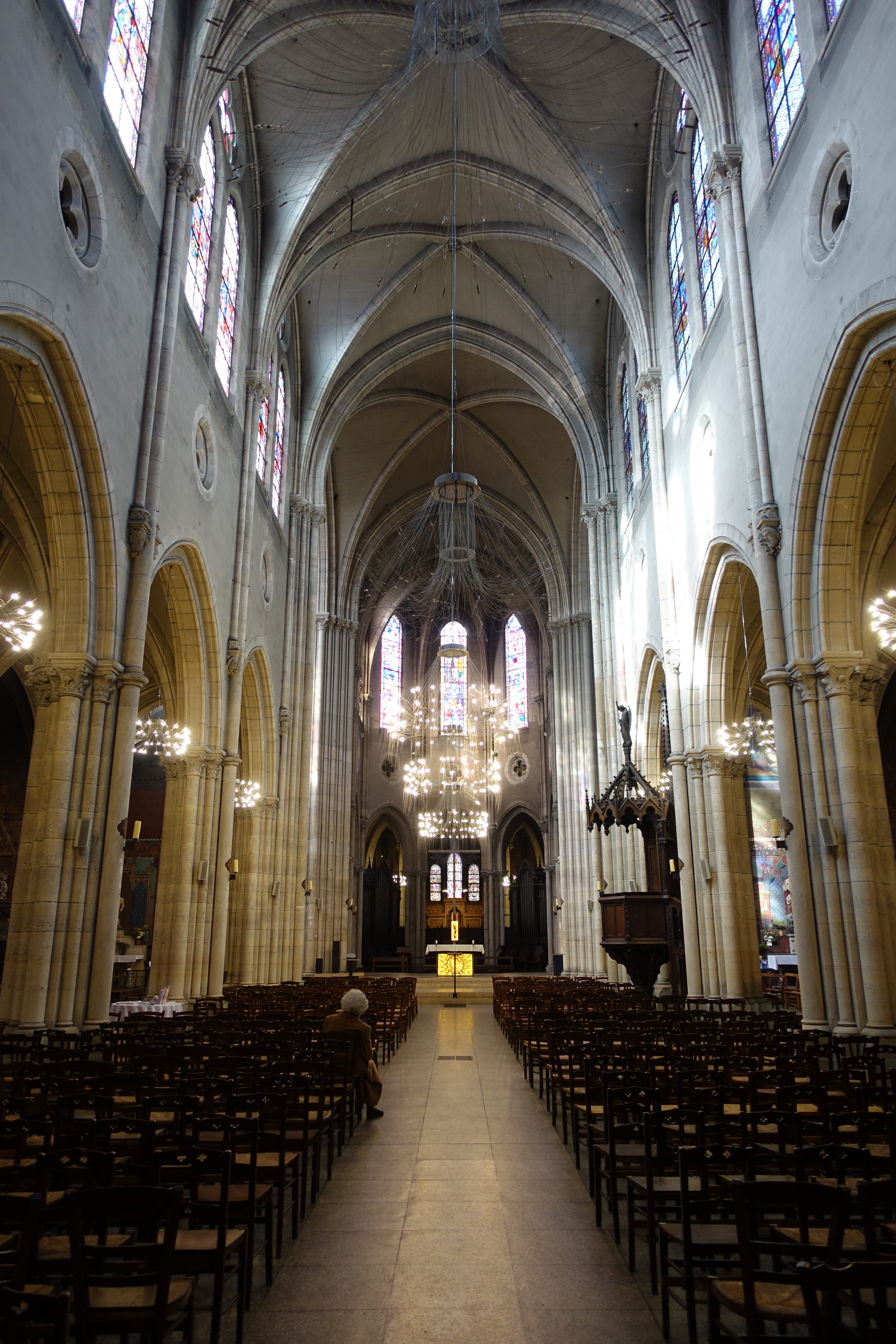
The nave facing the choir

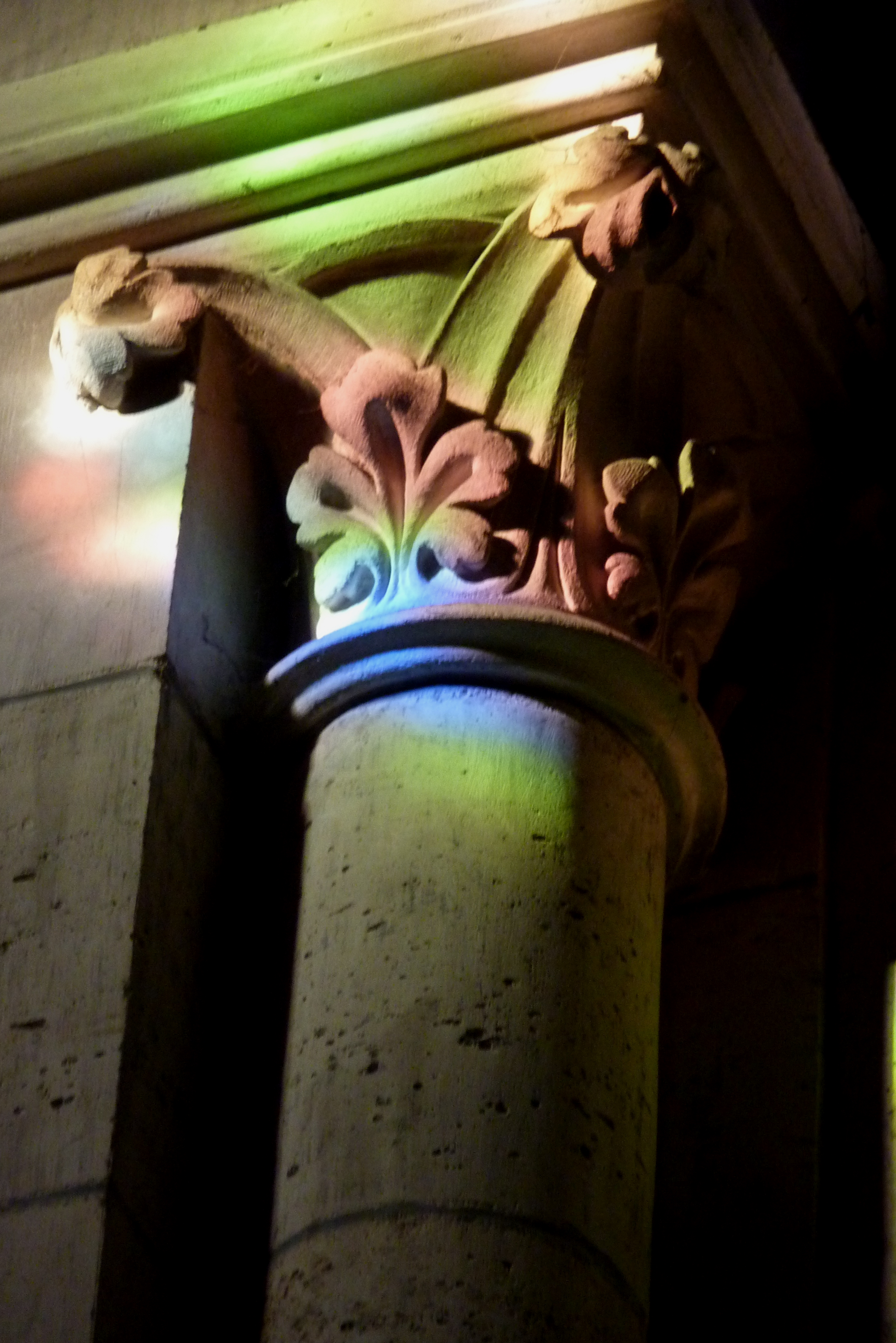
Decorated capitals of columns in the nave, coloured by light from stained glass

== Art and Decoration ==
=== Transept chapels ===
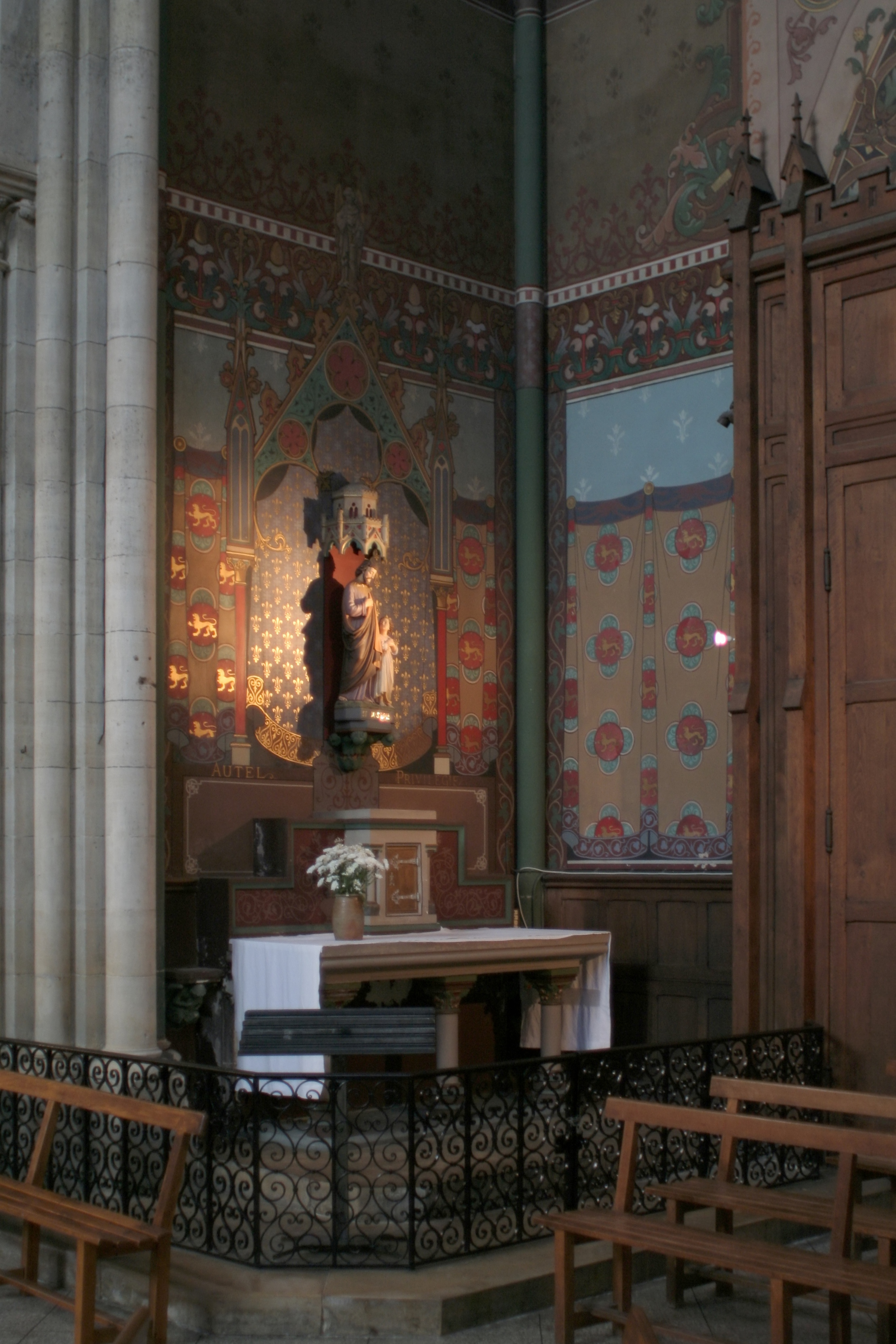
The south transept, on the right, houses the altar of Saint Joseph.

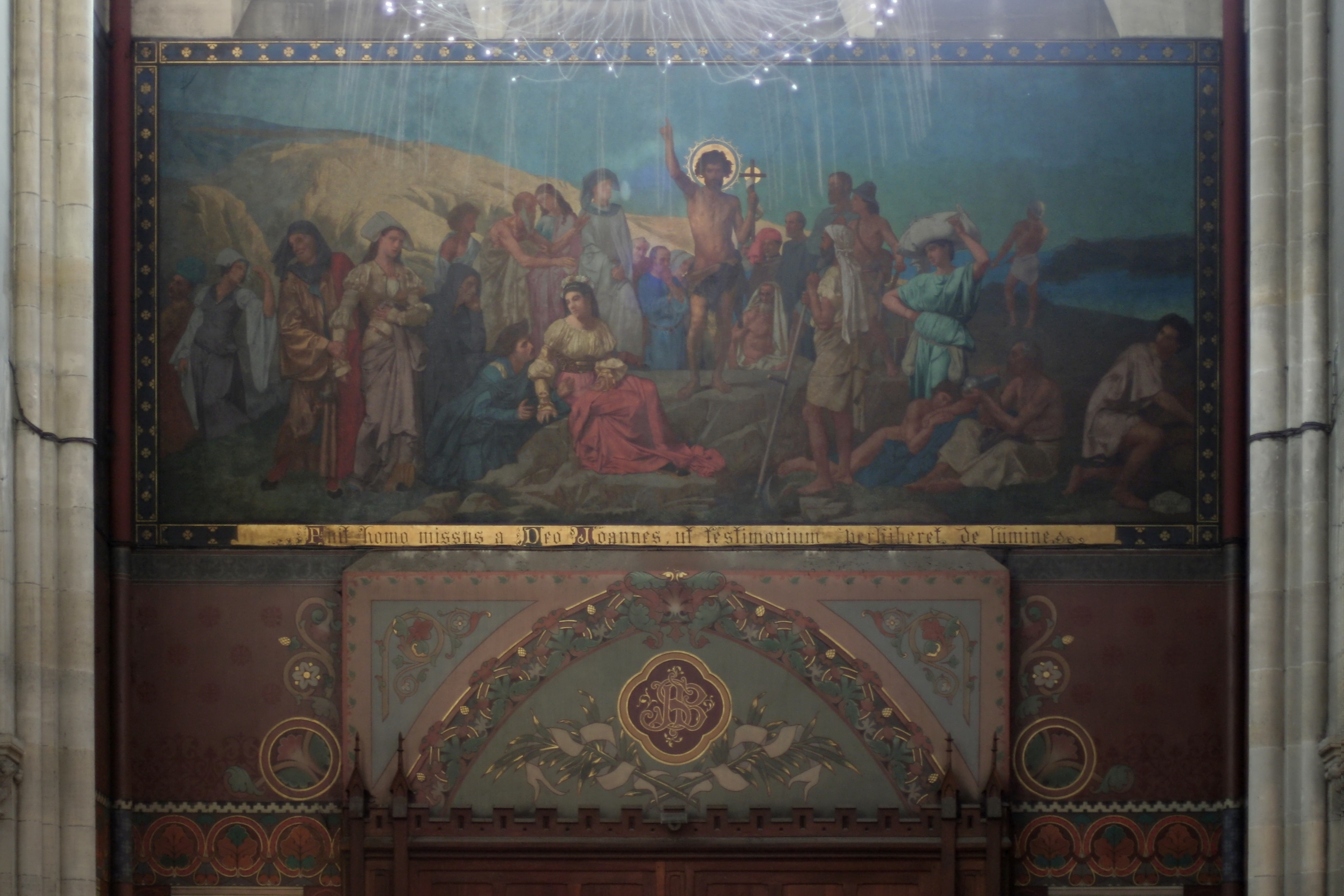
La Prédication de Jean
Théodore Maillot (North transept chapel)

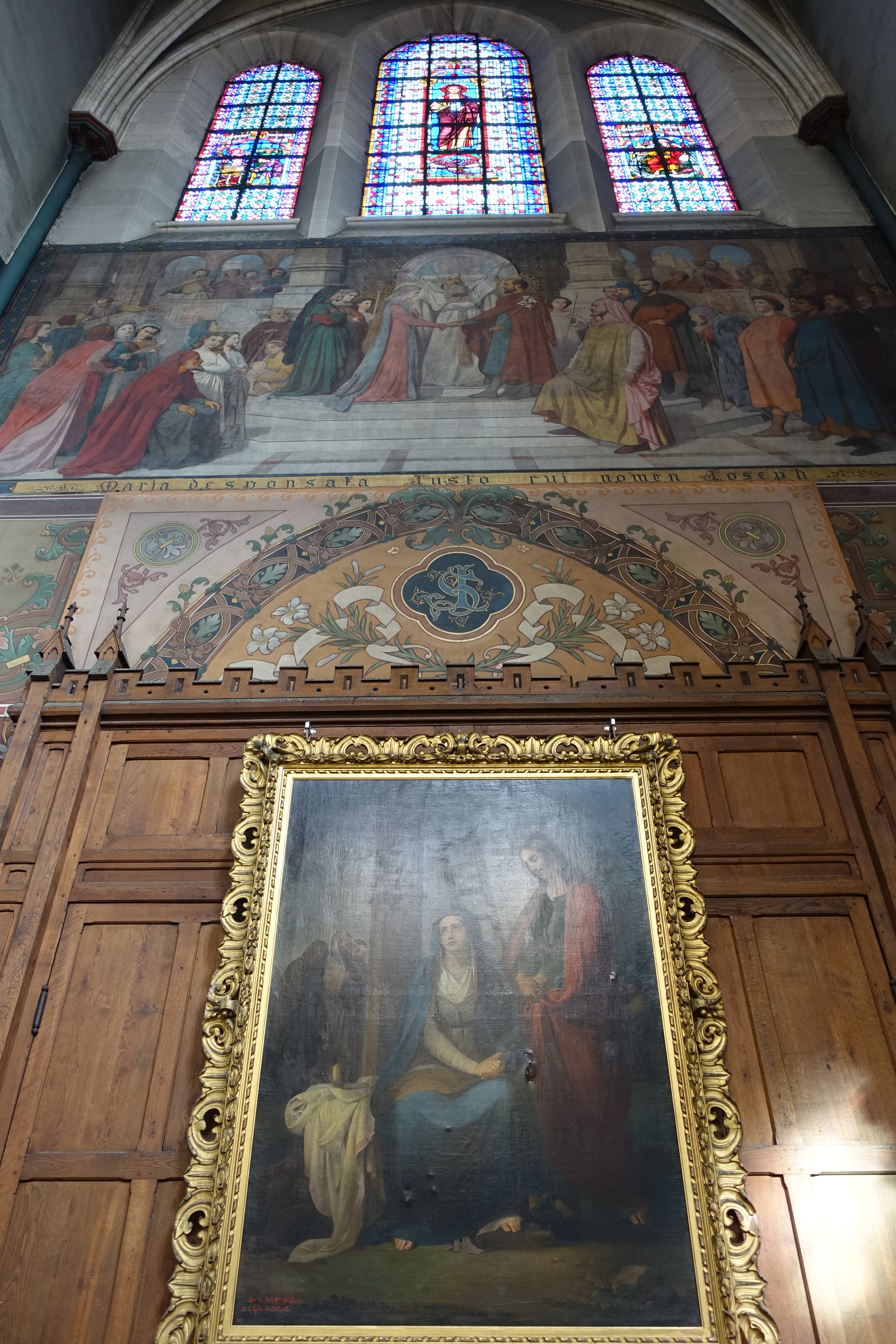
"The Virgin and Saint John at the foot of the cross" (North transept chapel)

The north transept, on the left facing the altar, houses the altar of Saint John the Baptist. It is decorated with three frescoes by Théodore Maillot:

- The baptism of Christ by Saint John
- The preaching of John.
- The beheading of John (Mt 14.3-12)

The south transept, on the right facing the choir, houses the altar of Saint Joseph. It is decorated with three frescoes by Auguste Leloir

- The death of Joseph
- The Marriage of the Virgin.
- The Nativity

The stained glass windows in the south transept depict Saint John the Evangelist: the martyrdom of Saint John, John the Evangelist, and John writing the Apocalypse before the seven Churches of Asia.

=== Stained glass ===
The stained glass windows in the choir and nave are a prominent feature of the church. They were made in the 19th century by Louis-Charles Steinheil and Auguste de Martel, and depict scenes from the Old Testament, the life of Saint John and the life of the Virgin Mary. Their style is inspired by that of the Gothic of the windows of the 13th century. These stained glass windows illustrate stories from the Old Testament:

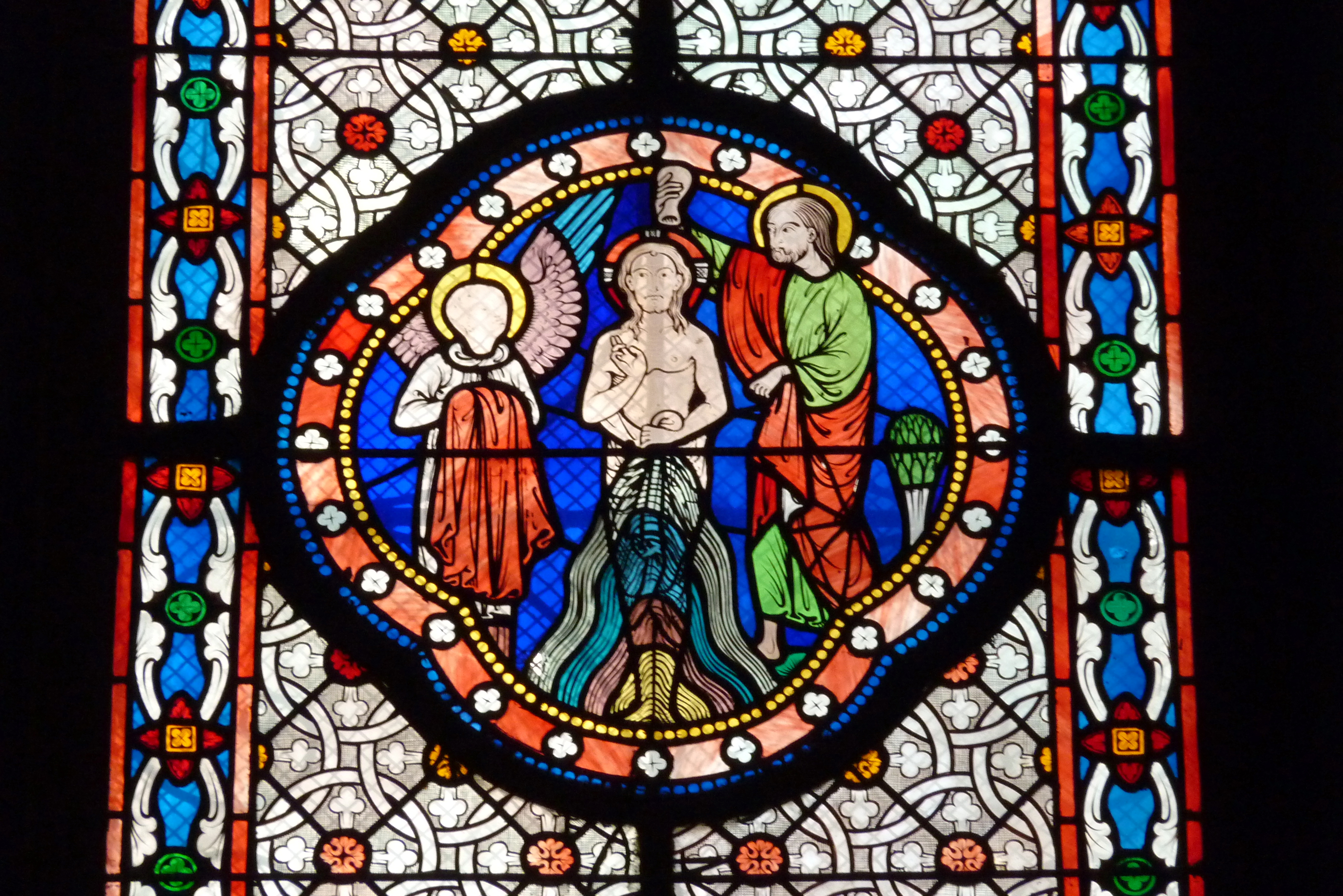
John the Baptist

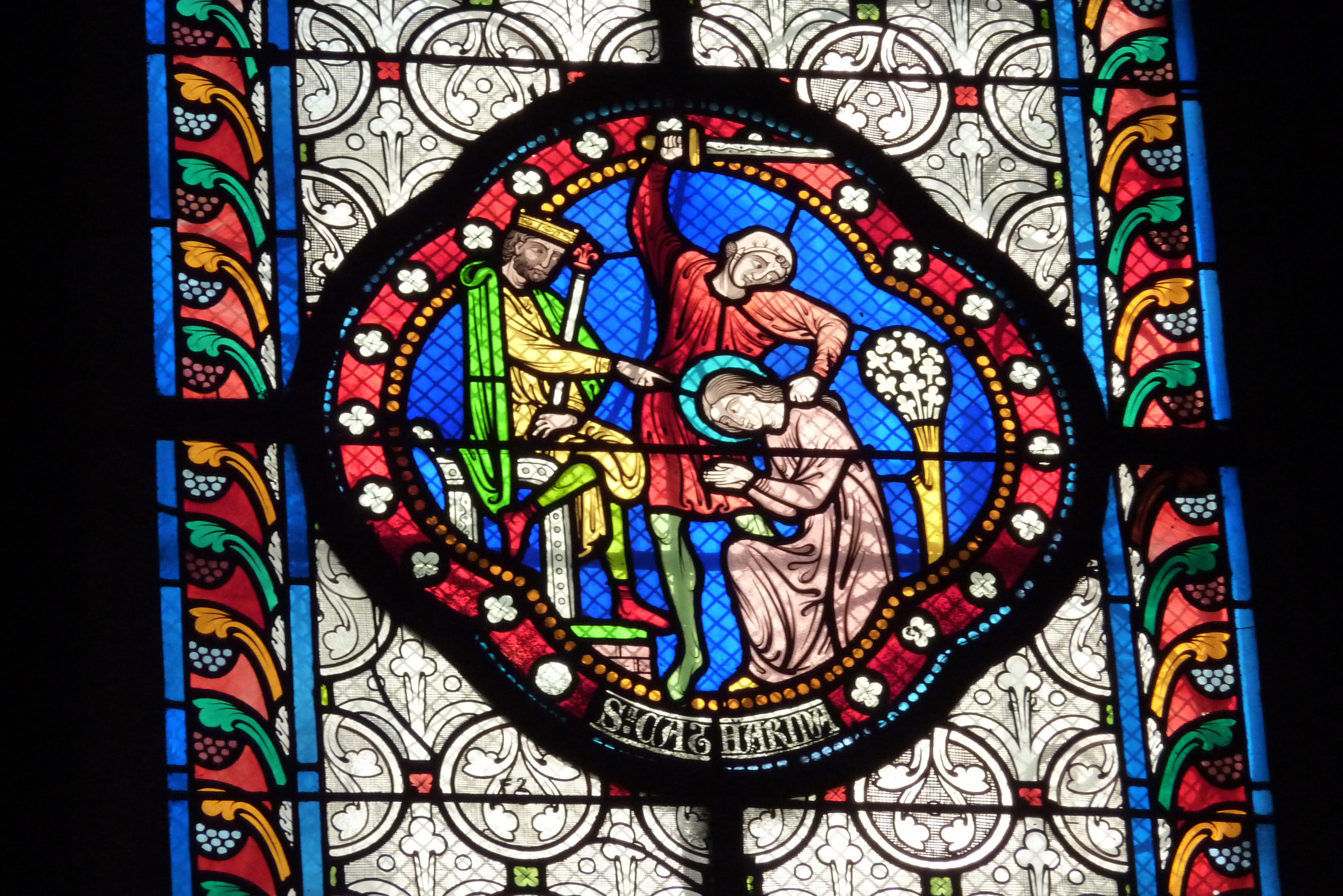
Beheading of Saint Martha

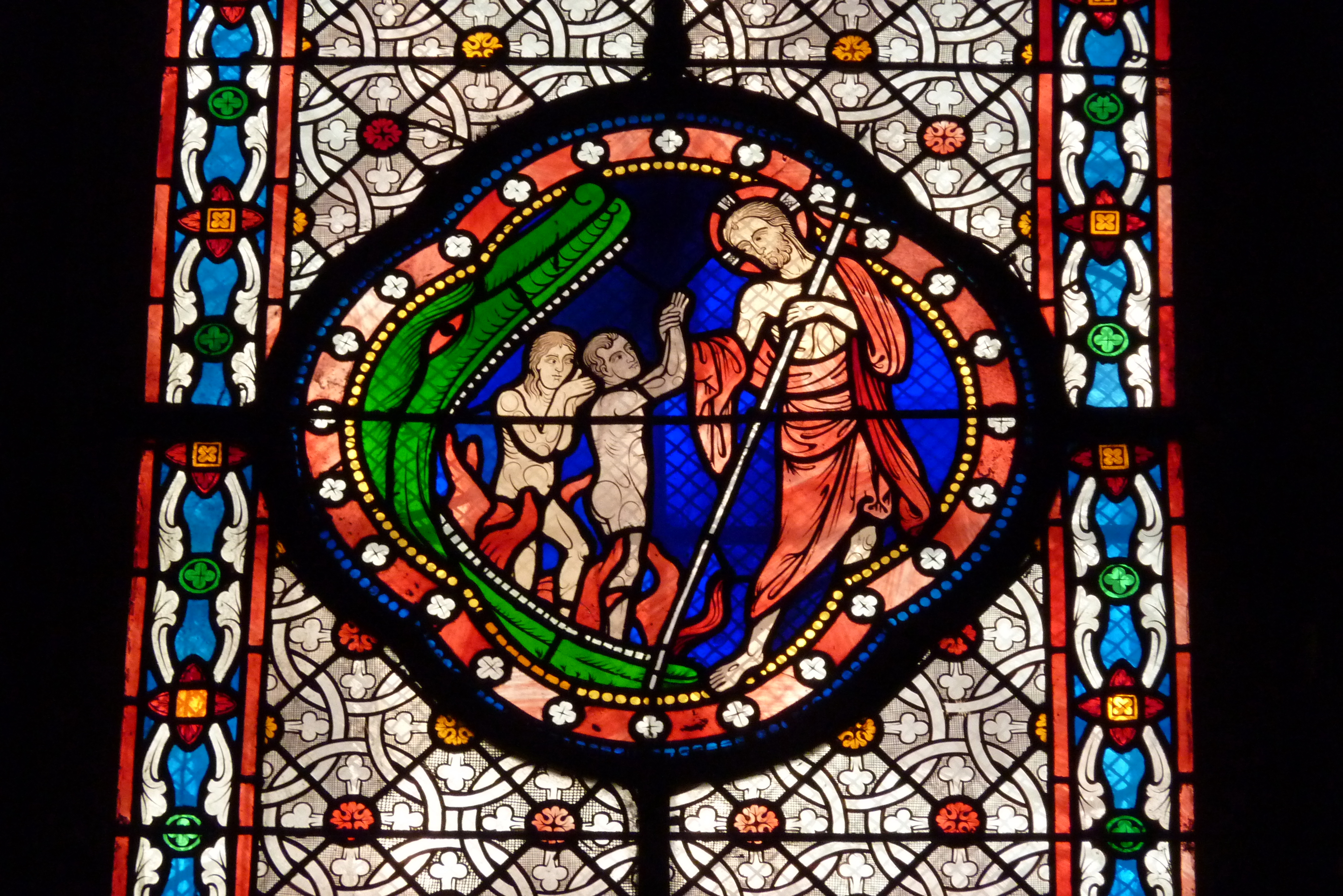
Christ rescuing sinners from hell

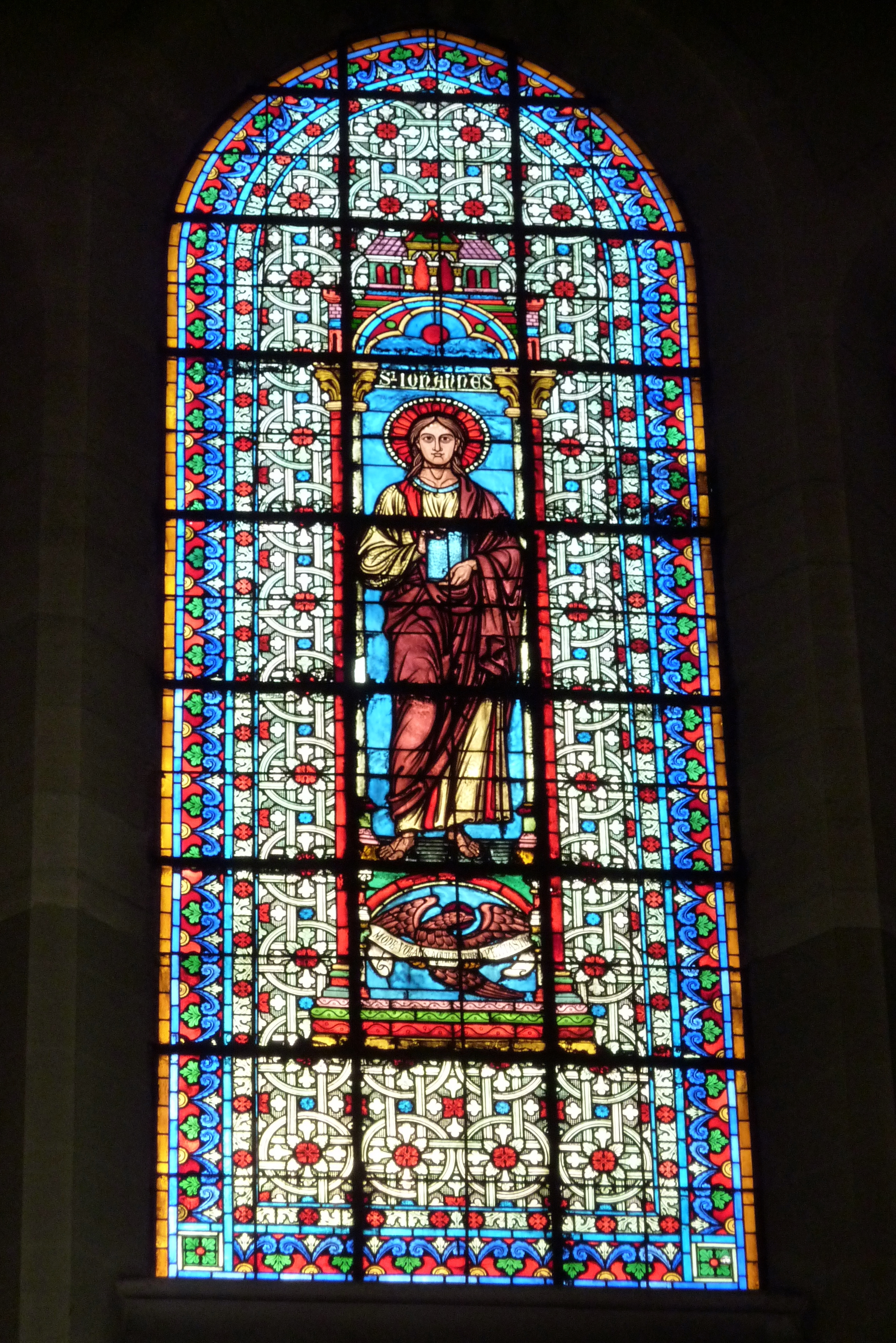
Saint John window

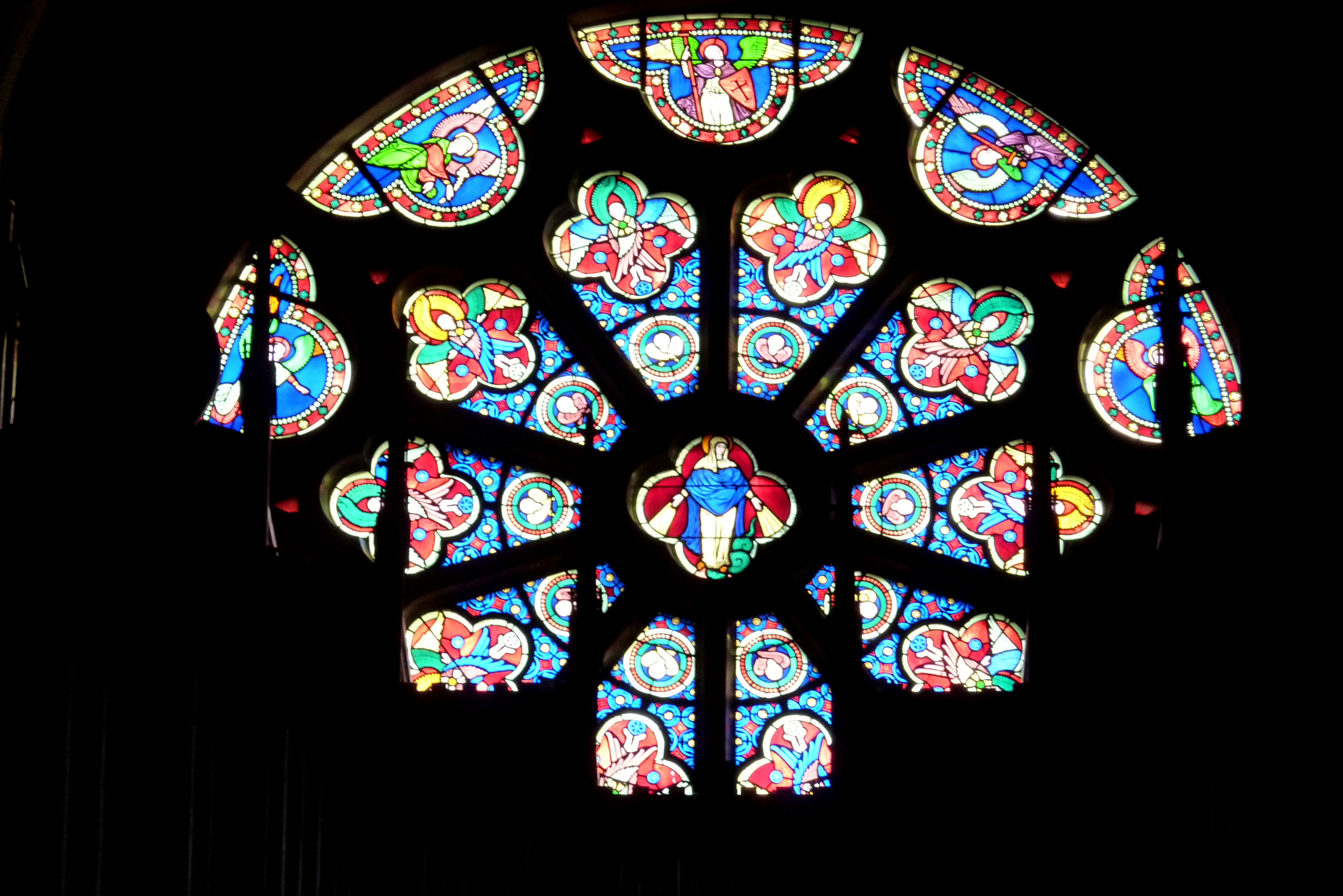
The rose window

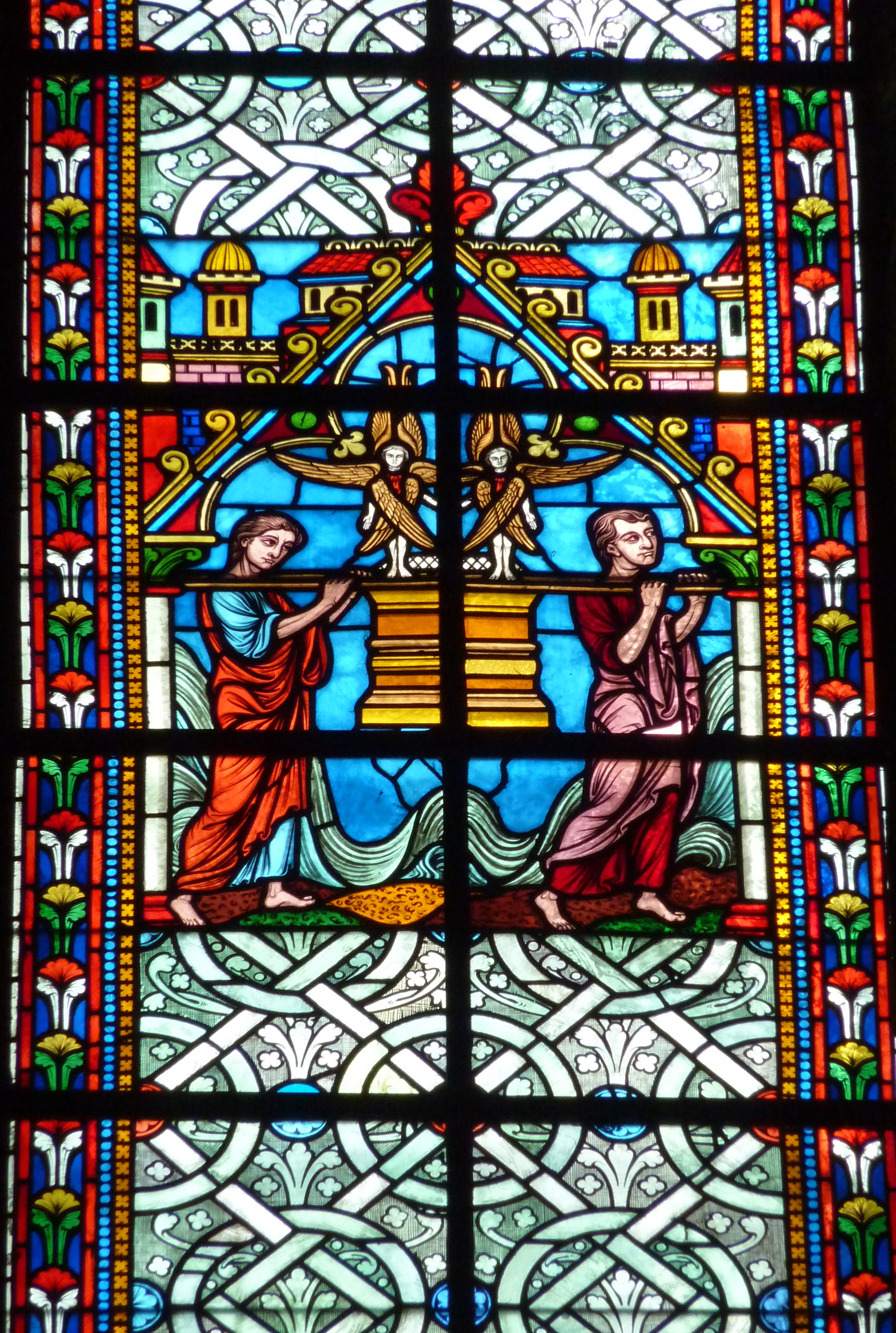
Procession of sacred relics

== The Altar and Relics ==
Like all the furniture in the sanctuary, the altar is the work of Ulysse Lacoste. During the consecration of the new altar in 2008, relics of Saint Jean-Marie Vianney, parish priest of Ars (1786–1859), were placed there. The altar is decorated with a stained glass window by Henri Guérin. It represents the Passover Lamb.

== Baptistry and Choir ==
The Baptistry is located in the choir. An octagon on the ground symbolic of the eighth day—the Jewish Sabbath.

== The organs ==
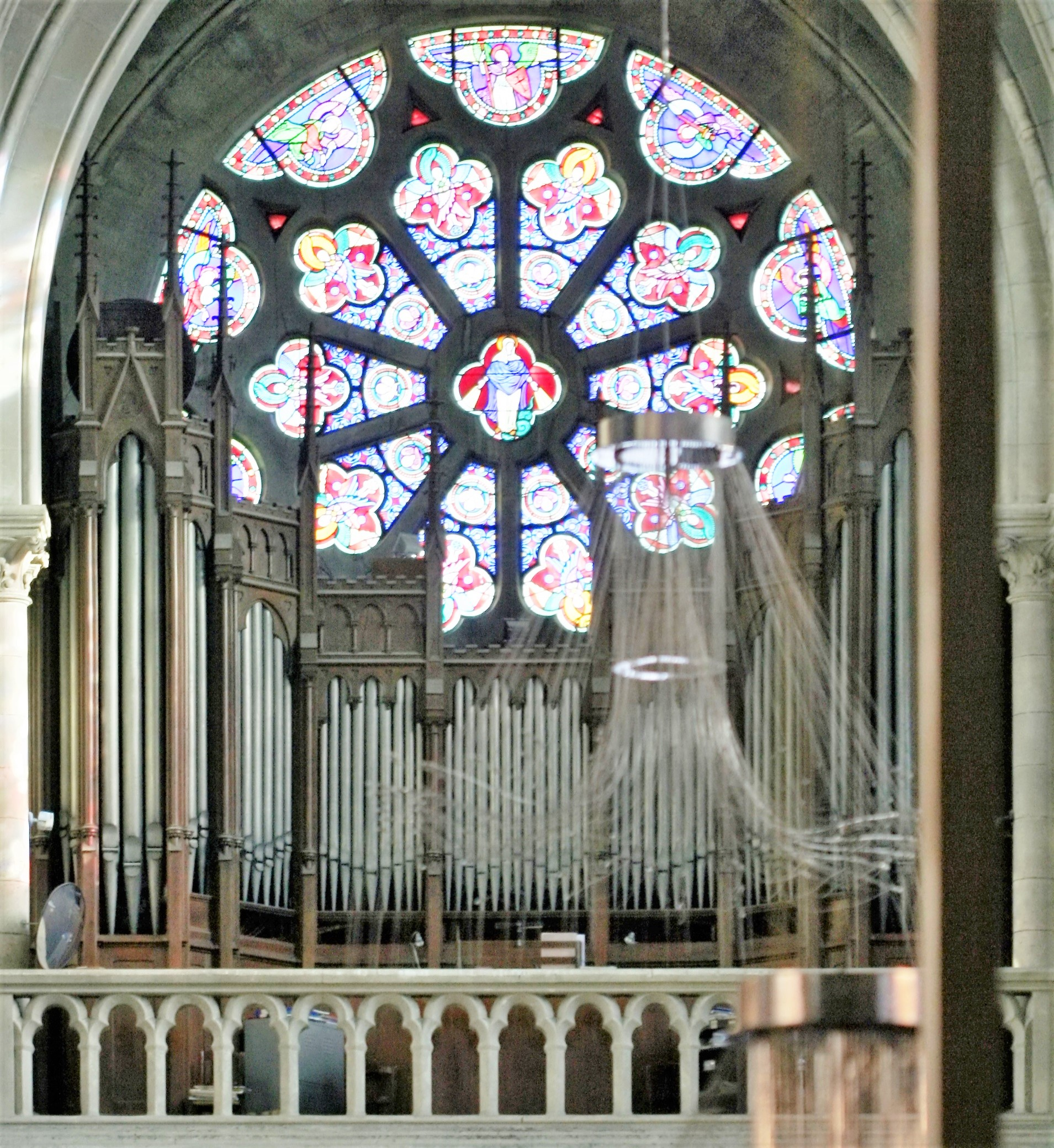
The grand organ in the tribune

=== Grand organ ===
The organ is in the tribune, at the back of the nave over the portal. It was built by Cavaillé-Coll in 1863 and restored by Roethinger in 1960, Beuchet in 1976, and Bernard Dargassies in 2003. It has two 56-note keyboards and 30-note pedal boards, Electrical transmissions, and twenty-two effects.

- 16' drone
- Watch 8'
- 8' drone
- Harmonic flute 8'
- Salicional 8'
- Providing 4'
- Doublet 2'
- IV rgs supply
- Cymbal III rgs
- Trumpet 8'
- Bugle 4'

Expressive story:

- Night horn 8'
- Gambe 8'
- Heavenly voice
- 4' flute
- Doublet 2'
- Trumpet 8'
- Oboe 8'

Pedal:

- 16' flute
- 8' flute
- Bombarde 16'
- Trumpet 8'

Pairings: Story/Grand organ in 16', 8'. Tirasses: Grand organ, Story. General crescendo. Call of reeds on the three keyboards. Tutti.

=== Choir Organ ===
The organ of the choir was built by Marie Antoine Louis Suret, and was finished in 1859. It is composed of two keyboards of 54 notes and an 18-note pedalboard. The transmissions are mechanical. It has thirteen jeux or effects. In front of the two organ cases are six choir stalls designed by Lassus.
