= Jean-Baptiste Lassus =

French architect (1807–1857)

Jean-Baptiste-Antoine Lassus
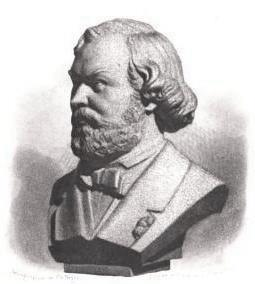
- Lassus from the Album de Villard de Honnecourt, Paris, 1858
- Born: 19 March 1807; Paris, France
- Died: 15 July 1857 (aged 50); Vichy, France
- Occupation: Architect

Jean-Baptiste-Antoine Lassus (19 March 1807 – 15 July 1857) was a French architect who became an expert in restoration or recreation of medieval architecture. He was a strong believer in the early Gothic architecture style, which he thought as a true French and Christian tradition, and was opposed to the classical Graeco-Roman styles promoted by the academic establishment.

== Life ==
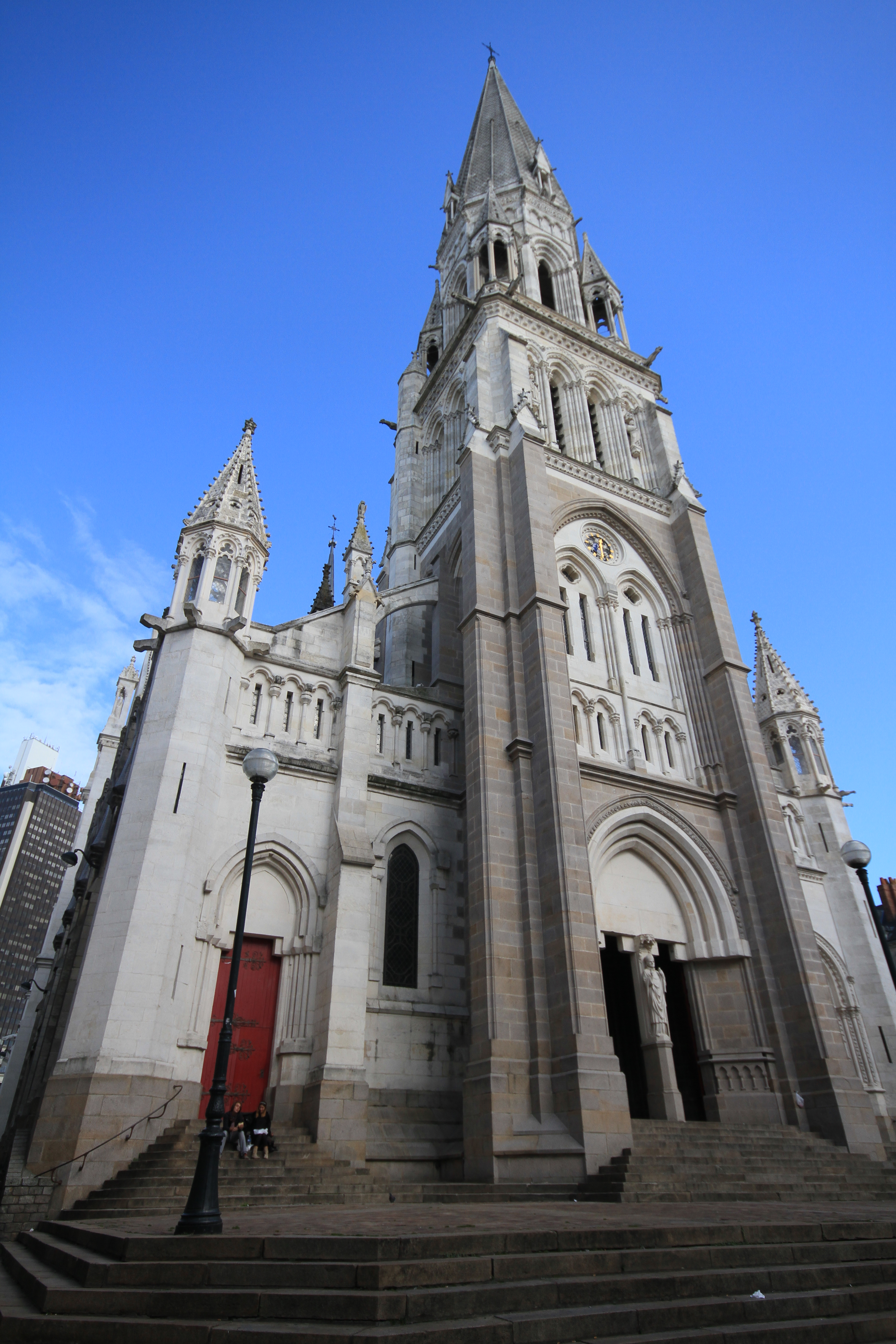
Basilique Saint-Nicolas de Nantes

=== Early years ===
Jean-Baptiste-Antoine Lassus was born in Paris on 19 March 1807. He studied at the Collège Stanislas de Paris, and in 1823 was given drawing lessons by Christophe Civeton. In 1828 he was admitted to the École des Beaux-Arts in Paris, where he was a pupil of Louis-Hippolyte Lebas. He left the school in 1830 and joined the architectural studio of Henri Labrouste. Lassus submitted a plan to the Salon of 1833 for rebuilding the Tuileries Palace to return to the original design of Philibert de l'Orme. In 1835 he proposed restoration of the Gothic-style Sainte-Chapelle. He submitted a plan to the Salon of 1836 to restore the refectory of Saint-Martin-des-Champs Priory.

=== Professional career ===
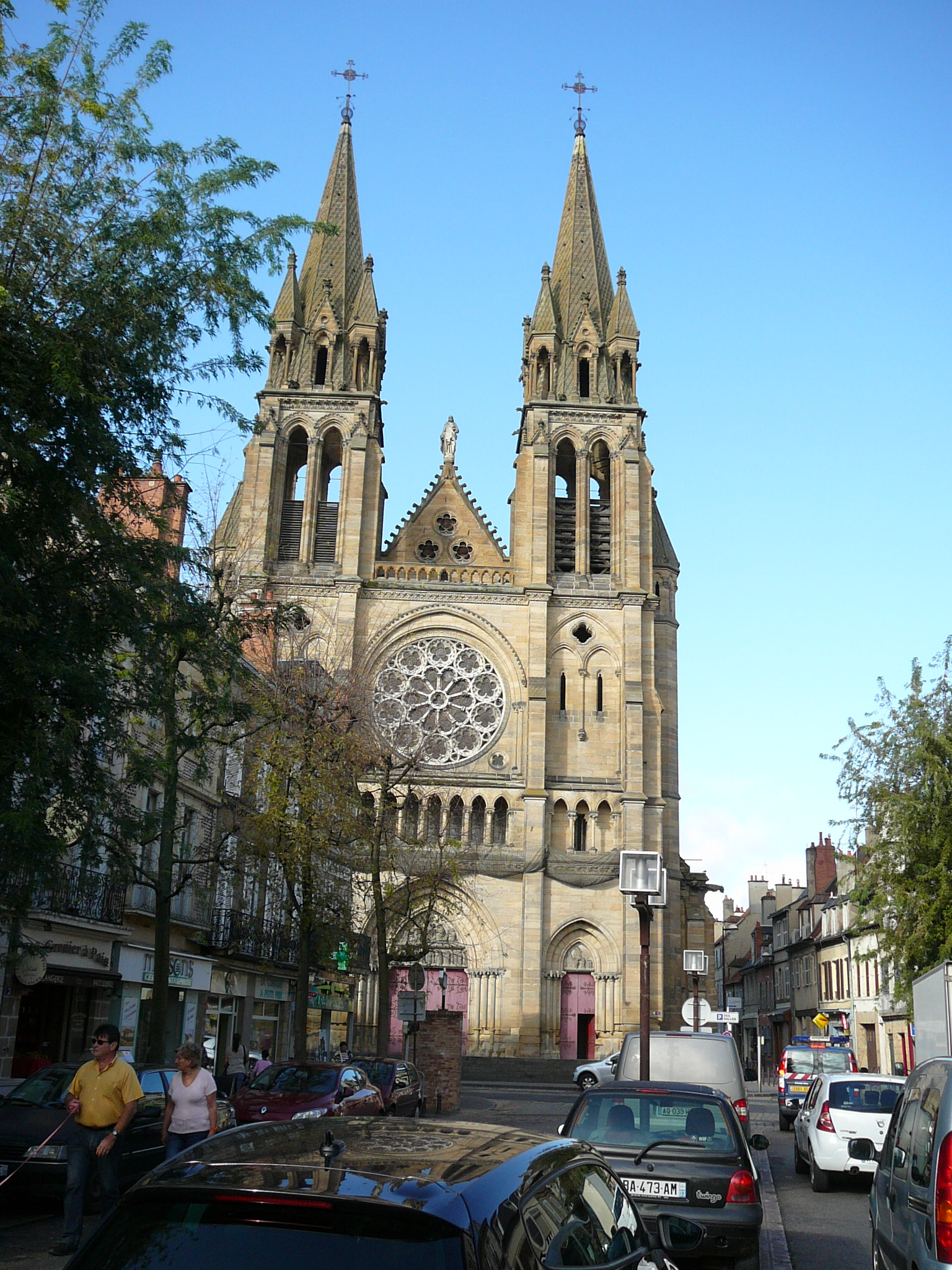
Église du Sacré-Cœur de Moulins

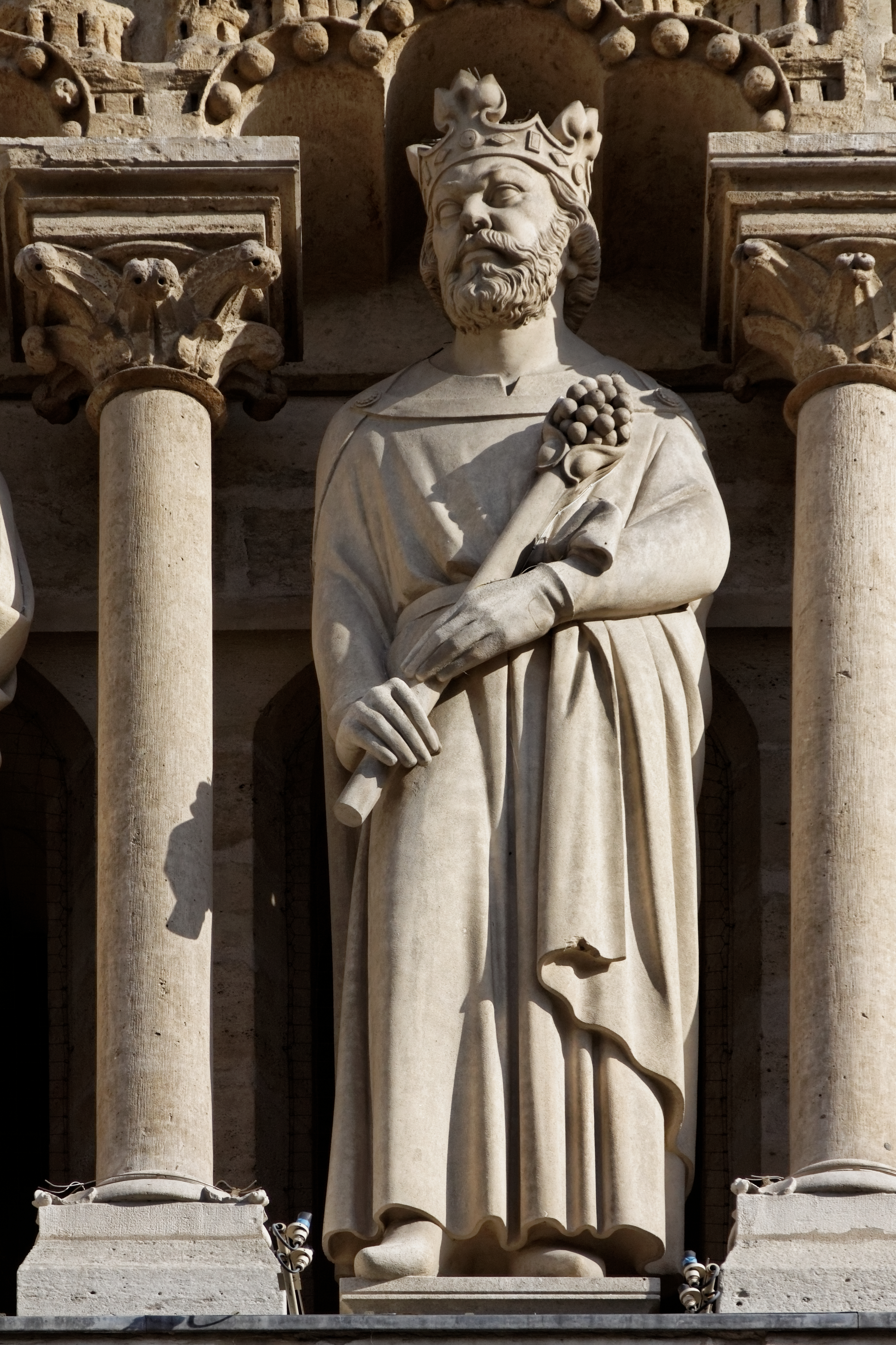
Lassus' likeness was captured in the 23rd statue in the Kings' Gallery at Notre-Dame

Lassus took commissions to design churches and extensions to convents. In 1835 he began to restore Saint-Séverin, Paris. In 1836 Lassus and Félix Duban were given the task of restoring Sainte-Chapelle. He worked on this project for the rest of his life, concentrating on the spire and the decorations of the interior, which he restored to their earlier form. In 1837 he was named architect for the restoration of Saint-Séverin. In 1839 Lassus and Étienne-Hippolyte Godde were given the task of restoring Saint-Germain l'Auxerrois. In 1840 Lassus was asked to undertaken construction of the Basilique Saint-Nicolas de Nantes. In 1841 he built the tomb of the Abbé Charles-Michel de l'Épée in Saint-Roch, Paris.

In 1843 Lassus and Eugène Viollet-le-Duc won the competition for restoration of Notre-Dame de Paris against Jean-Charles Danjoy and Jean-Jacques Arveuf. They replaced the old sculpture with new works, often moving the earlier sculptures to museums. Lassus was asked to build the petit séminaire on the rue Notre-Dame des champs in 1845. In 1848 he was asked to serve as an expert at the site of Nantes Cathedral, and was appointed diocesan architect of Chartres and Le Mans. Lassus and Louis Gabriel Esmonnot were commissioned to build the Sacré-Cœur in Moulins in 1849. In 1850 Lassus made the first studies for Saint-Pierre in Dijon. In 1852 he started a project to enlarge Moulins Cathedral. In 1853 he made initial studies for Saint-Jean-Baptiste in Belleville, Paris. In 1855 he was commissioned to build the church in Cusset.

Lassus contracted a disease of the liver, which he neglected. He died on 15 July 1857 in Vichy, where he had gone in search of a cure. His funeral was held in Notre-Dame on 20 July 1857. His tomb was designed by Viollet-le-Duc.

== Style ==
Lassus designed a few secular buildings, where he showed that he could build in fashionable Louis-Philippe or Louis XIII styles as required by his client, or for harmony with the surrounding buildings. However, he mostly worked on Gothic-style religious buildings, notably Saint-Nicolas de Nantes (1840), Sacré-Coeur de Moulins (1849), Saint-Pierre de Dijon (1850), Saint-Jean-Baptiste de Belleville(1853) and the Église de Cusset (1855).

Lassus was critical of the Académie française, which would only recognize pagan Greek and Roman architecture, which he saw as foreign imports. He said of Greek architecture that it did not suit the French religion or climate, or even the materials available in France. He strongly favored Gothic architecture, a Christian style that had originated in France. He was a purist, would only use historical building materials and tried to remain true to original concepts. He believed that the buildings of the first Gothic period were rational and functional, the peak of French architecture. Later Gothic had degenerated and Renaissance architecture introduced foreign and pagan influences. He considered that restoration of Gothic buildings must respect their formal and structural authenticity. The principles of the first Gothic period would be the basis for a new 19th century architecture.

== Publications ==
- Jean-Baptiste Lassus; Eugène-Emmanuel Viollet-le-Duc (1843). Projet de restauration de Notre-Dame de Paris, rapport adressé à M. le ministre de la Justice et des Cultes, annexé au projet de restauration remis le 31 janvier 1843. Paris: Mme de Lacombe impr. p. 40.
- Jean-Baptiste Lassus (1844). "Légende et tombeau de saint Ronan". Annales archéologiques. I: 186–188.
- Jean-Baptiste Lassus (1845). "De l'arc aigu appelé ogive". Annales archéologiques. II: 40.
- Jean-Baptiste Lassus (1846). "Réaction de l'Académie des beaux-arts contre l'art gothique". Paris: 14.
- Jean-Baptiste Lassus (1849). Rapport au ministre des Travaux publics sur l'isolement de la Sainte Chapelle. Paris: Imprimerie nationale.
- Jean-Baptiste Lassus (1851). Recueil des documents inédits ou rares sur la topographie et les monuments historiques de l'ancienne province du Maine sous la direction de l'abbé Lottin […] et de […] Lassus. Le Mans: M. Pescher.
- Jean-Baptiste Lassus; Paul Lacroix (1851). Histoire et description des mœurs et usages, du commerce et de l'industrie, des sciences, des arts, des littératures et des beaux-arts en Europe. Paris.
- M. E. Hucher with MM. Lassus, Drouet, […] Anjubault et L. Charles […] (1856). Études sur l'histoire et les monuments du département de la Sarthe. Le Mans: Monnoye. p. 276.
- Jean-Baptiste Lassus (1856–57). "De l'éclectisme dans l'art". Revue universelle des arts: 245ff.
- Jean-Baptiste Lassus (1858). Considérations sur la renaissance de l'art français au XIXe siècle. Préface à l'Album de Villard de Honnecourt. Paris: Imprimerie impériale. p. 218.
- Jean-Baptiste Lassus, Eugène Emmanuel Amaury Duval, Adolphe Didron (1867). Monographie de la cathédrale de Chartres. Vol. 1–9. Paris: Imprimerie impériale.

== Sources ==
- Camille, Michael (2009-06-15). The Gargoyles of Notre-Dame: Medievalism and the Monsters of Modernity. University of Chicago Press. ISBN 978-0-226-09245-4.
- Leniaud, Jean-Michel (2009-02-04). "LASSUS, Jean-Baptiste-Antoine". INHA. Archived from the original on 2015-07-07.
- Leniaud, Jean-Michel (2015). "LASSUS Jean-Baptiste". École nationale des chartes.
- Sorensen, Lee (2010). "Lassus, Jean-Bapiste[-Antoine]". Dictionary of Art Historians. Archived from the original on 2016-03-04.
- Veyrat, Georges; Claretie, Jules (1892). "Lassus (Jean-Baptiste-Antoine)". Les statues de l'Hôtel de Ville (in French). Librairies-imprimeries réunies. p. 282.
