= Palais de la Cité =

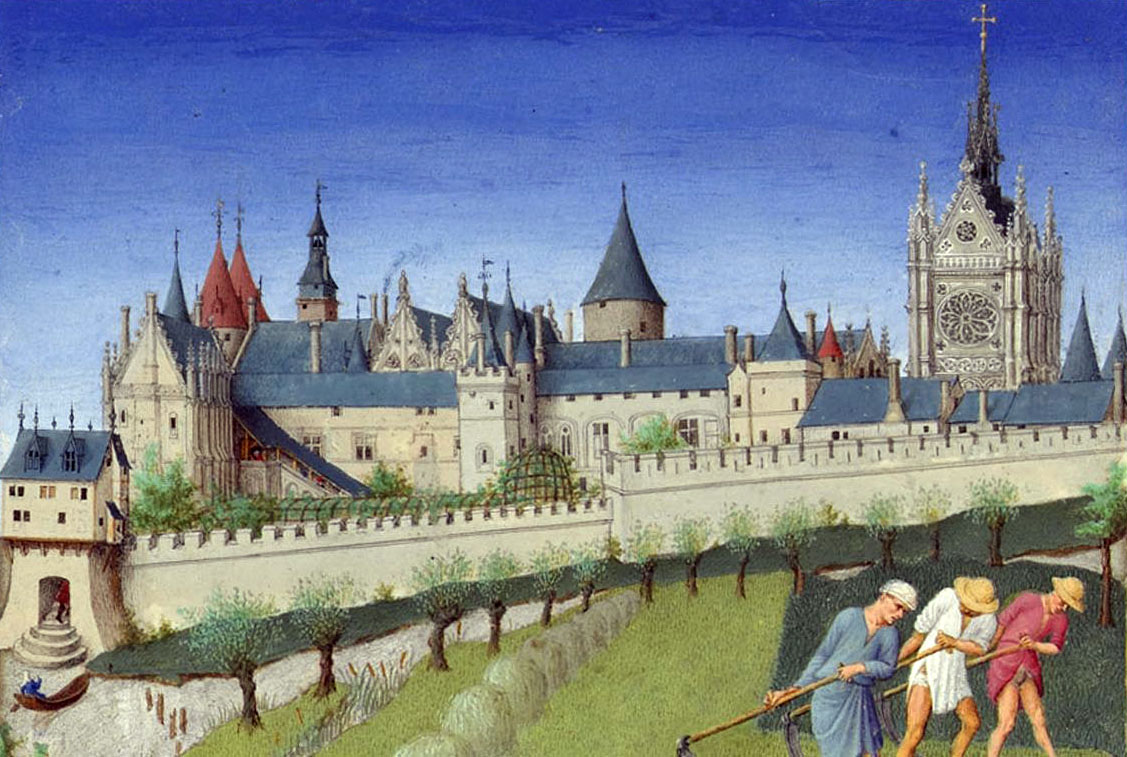
- View from the west, c. mid-1410s, in the Très Riches Heures du Duc de Berry. From left to right, the Salle sur l'eau, Logis du Roi, and Sainte-Chapelle; upper sections of the still-standing northern front towers, gables of the Grande Salle, and 12th-century circular keep (demolished 1778) are visible behind.

- Location within Paris
- Alternative names: Palais de Justice

General information
- Type: palace
- Architectural style: multiple styles; surviving structures from 13C Rayonnant Gothic to early-20C Eclecticism
- Location: Île de la Cité, Paris, France
- Coordinates: 48.8564°N 2.3456°E
- Construction started: Roman Empire
- Completed: 1914

Website
- http://www.paris-conciergerie.fr/en/

The Palais de la Cité (French pronunciation: [palɛ d(ə) la site]), located on the Seine River's Île de la Cité, is a major historic building in the centre of Paris, France. It was an occasional residence of the Kings of France from the early 6th to the 12th century and a permanent one from the late 12th to the 14th century, and has been the center of the French justice system ever since, for which it is also referred to as the Palais de Justice.

From the 14th century until the French Revolution, the Palais was the headquarters of the Parlement of Paris. During the Revolution it served as a courthouse and prison, where Marie Antoinette and other prisoners were held and tried by the Revolutionary Tribunal. Since the early 19th century, it has been the seat of the Tribunal de grande instance de Paris, the Court of Appeal of Paris, and the Court of Cassation. The first of these moved to another Parisian location in 2018, while the latter two jurisdictions remain located in the Palais de la Cité as of 2025.

The palace was built up and restructured many times over the course of many centuries, including following major fires in 1618, 1776 and 1871. Its salient medieval remains are the Sainte-Chapelle, a masterpiece of Gothic architecture, and the Conciergerie, an early-14th-century palatial complex that served as a prison from 1380 to 1914. Most of its other current structures were rebuilt from the late 18th to early 20th centuries. The Conciergerie and Sainte-Chapelle can be visited via separate entrances.

== History ==
=== Roman Empire and Early Middle Ages ===
Archeological excavations have found traces of human habitation on the Île de la Cité from 5000 BC until the beginning of the Iron Age, but no evidence that the Celtic inhabitants, the Parisii, used the island as their capital. Julius Caesar recorded meeting with the leaders of the Parisii and other Celtic tribes on the island in 53 B.C., but no archeological evidence of the Parisii has been found there. However, after the Romans conquered the Parisii in the first century BC, the island was developed quickly. While the forum and largest part of the Roman town, called Lutetia, was on the left bank, a large temple was located on the east end of the island, where the Cathedral of Notre Dame de Paris is found today. The west end of the island was residential, and was the site of the palace of the Roman prefects, or governors. The palace was a Gallo-Roman fortress surrounded by ramparts. In the year 360 AD, the Roman caesar Julian the Apostate was declared Emperor of Rome by his soldiers while he was resident in the city.

Beginning in the 6th century, the Merovingian kings used the palace as their residence when they were in Paris. Clovis, the king of the Franks, lived in the palace from 508 until his death in 511. The kings who followed him, the Carolingians, moved their capital to the eastern part of their empire, and paid little attention to Paris. At the end of the 9th century, after a series of invasions by the Vikings threatened the city, King Charles the Bald had the walls rebuilt and strengthened. Hugh Capet (941-996), the Count of Paris, was elected king of France on 3 July 987, and resided in the fortress when he was in Paris, but he and the other Capetian kings spent little time in the city, and had other royal residences in Vincennes, Compiègne and Orleans. The administration and archives of the kingdom travelled wherever the king went.

=== High Middle Ages ===
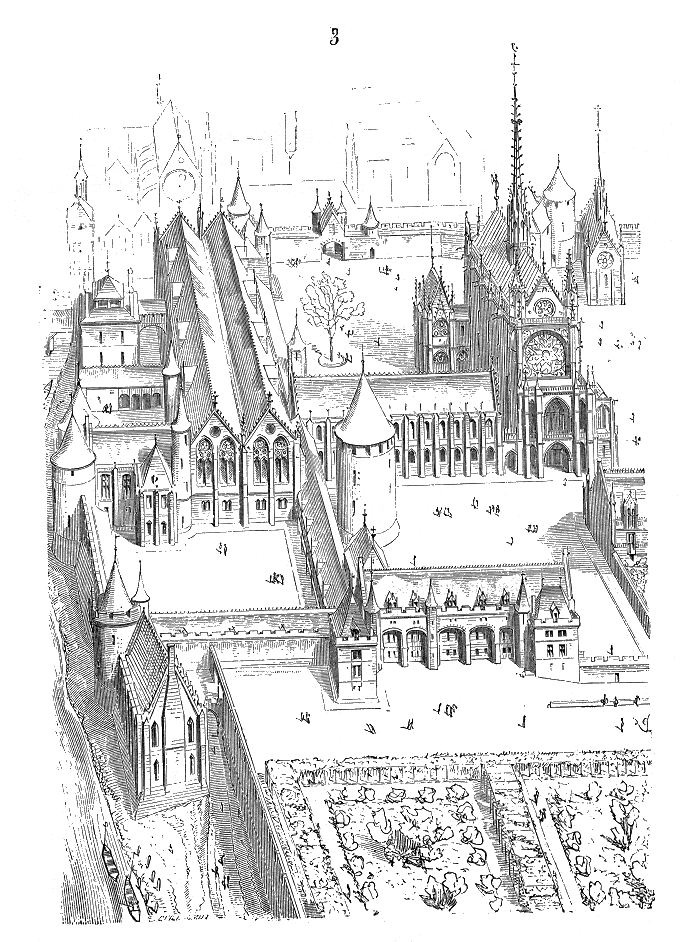
Drawing of the Palace as it looked following the construction of Sainte-Chapelle (consecrated in 1248), by Viollet-le-Duc

==== Early Capetian era ====
At the beginning of the Capetian dynasty, the king of France ruled directly little more than what is now the Île-de-France; but through a policy of conquest and intermarriage, they began to expand the royal domain, and to transform the old Gallo-Roman fortress into a real palace. Robert the Pious, the son of Hugh Capet, who ruled from 996 to 1031, stayed in Paris more often than his predecessors. He rebuilt the fortress in particular to meet the demands of his third wife, Constance of Arles, for greater comfort. Robert reinforced the old walls and added fortified gates; the main entrance, most likely, was on the north side. The walls surrounded a rectangle 130 meters long and 110 meters wide. Within the walls Robert had constructed the Salle de Roi, the meeting room for the Curia Regis, the assembly of nobles and for the royal council. To the west of this building he built his own residence, the chambre de Roi. Finally, he built a chapel dedicated to Saint Nicholas.

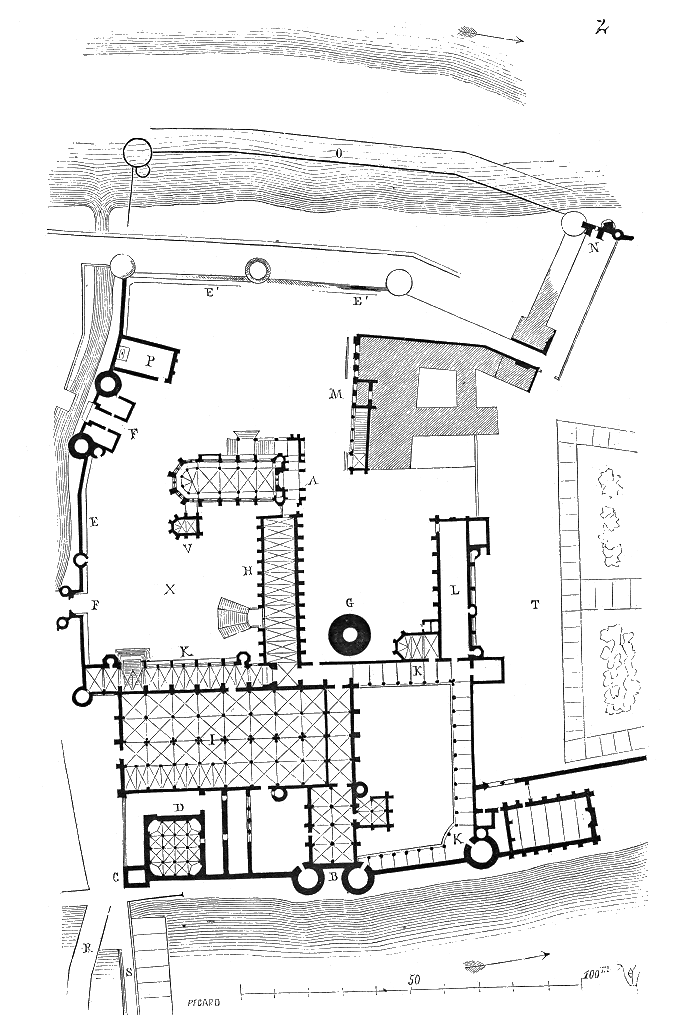
Floor plan of the palace as it looked following the construction of Sainte-Chapelle, by Eugène Viollet-le-Duc. A is the Sainte-Chapelle; B is the towers of Tour d'Argent and Tour de Cesar; C is the Tour de l'Horloge; D the royal kitchens, added after Louis IX's reign; E shows the outer walls with the gates as F; G is the Montgomery Tower; H is the Galerie Merciére; I the great hall; K the porticos around the Conciergerie; L the Palais de St Louis, which served as royal apartment; M is the chamber of accounts; N the postern tower; O shows the walls built in the 14th century; P is the chapel of St Michel; R the Pont aux Changeurs; S the Pont aux Meuniers, known as the Grand Pont; T is the royal gardens; V is the sacristy and treasury of charters, attached to Sainte-Chapelle; and X is the Cour du Mai.

Further additions were made by Louis VI, with the help of his friend and ally, Suger, the Abbot of the Basilica of Saint-Denis. Louis VI finished the chapel of Saint Nicholas, demolished the old tower or donjon in the center, and built a massive new donjon, the Grosse Tour, 11.7 meters wide at the base, with walls three meters thick. This tower existed until 1776.

His son, Louis VII (1120–1180) enlarged the royal residence and added an oratory; the lower floor of the oratory later became the chapel of the present Conciergerie. The entrance to the palace at this time was on the eastern side, on the Cour du Mai, where a grand ceremonial stairway was constructed. The western point of the island was transformed into a walled garden and orchard.

==== Philip II Augustus ====
Philip-Augustus (1180-1223) modernized the royal administration, and placed the royal archives, the treasury and courts within Palais de la Cité, and thereafter the city functioned, except for brief periods, as the capital of the kingdom. In 1187 he welcomed the English king, Richard the Lion-Heart, to his palace. The court records show the creation of a new official position, the Concierge, who was responsible for the administration of the lower and mid-level law courts within the palace. The palace later took its name from this position. Philip also greatly improved the air and aroma around the palace by having the muddy streets around it paved with stone. These were the first paved streets in Paris.

==== Louis IX and Sainte-Chapelle ====
The grandson of Philip Augustus, Louis IX (1214-1270), later known as Saint Louis, built a new shrine within the palace walls to demonstrate that he was not just king of France, but also the leader of the Christian world. Between 1242 and 1248, on the site of the old chapel, Louis built Sainte-Chapelle to hold the sacred relics he had acquired in 1238 from Baldwin II, Latin Emperor at Constantinople, including the reputed crown of thorns and wood from the cross of the Crucifixion of Christ. The chapel had two levels; the lower level for ordinary servants of the king, and the upper level for the king and royal family. The upper chapel was connected directly to the King's residence by a covered passage, called the Galerie Merciére. Only the King was allowed to touch the crown of thorns, which he took out each year on Good Friday.

Louis IX also created several new offices to manage the finances, administration and judicial system of his growing kingdom. This new bureaucracy, housed within the palace, eventually led to conflict between the royal government and the nobles, who had their own high court, the Parlement of Paris. To make room for his growing bureaucracy, and to create residences for the Chanoines or Canons, who managed the religious establishment, he had the southern wall of the palace demolished and replaced with housing. On the north side of the palace, just outside the walls to the Tour Bonbec, he built a new ceremonial hall, the Salle sur l'eau.

==== Philip IV ====
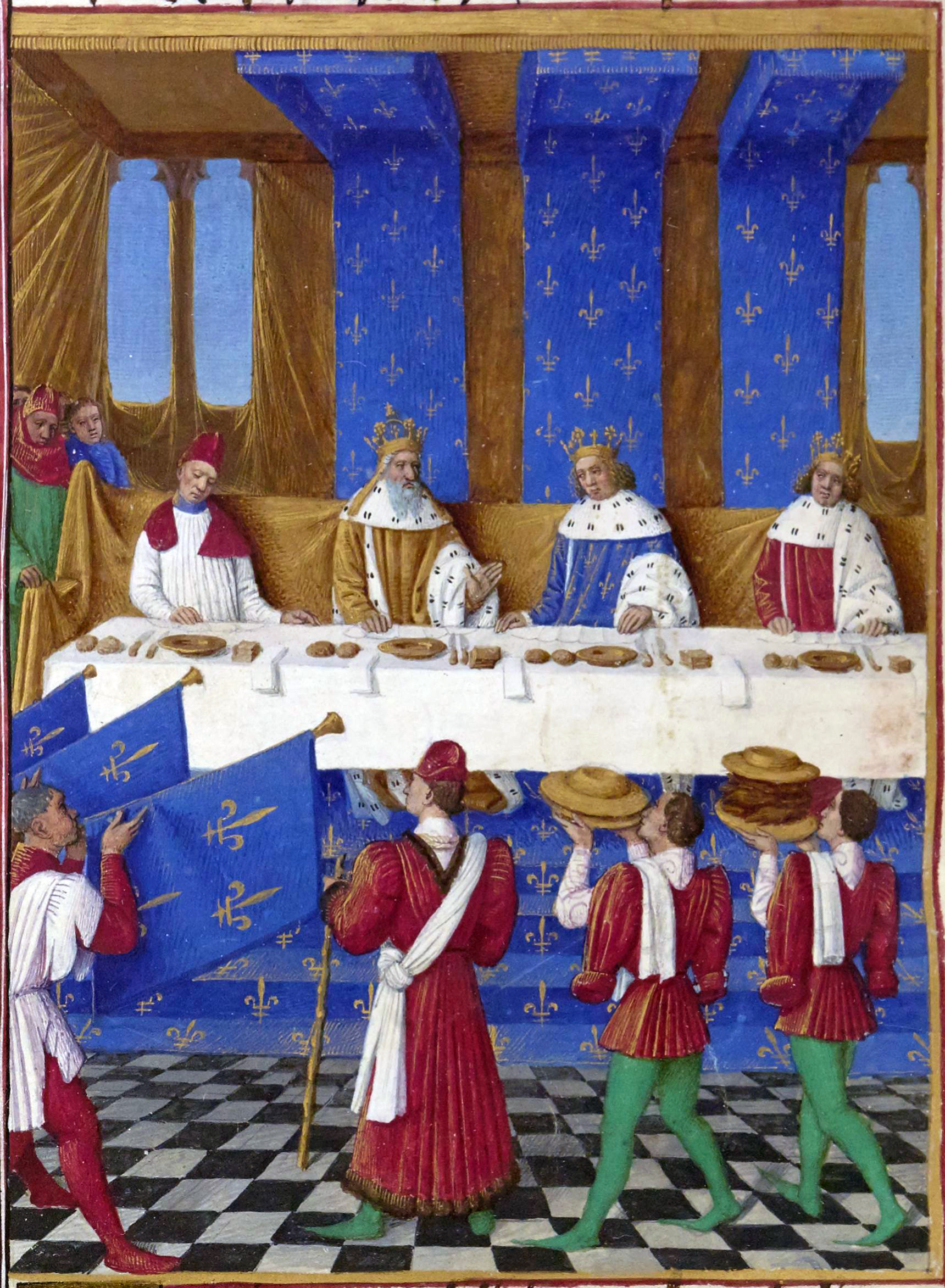
A banquet in 1358 hosted by Charles V of France in the Grand'Salle for his uncle Charles IV, Holy Roman Emperor by Jean Fouquet

Philip IV (1285-1314) and his Chamberlain, Enguerrand de Marigny, reconstructed, enlarged and embellished the palace. On the north side, he expropriated land belonging to the dukes of Brittany and constructed new buildings for the Chambre des Enquetes, which supervised public administration; the Grand'Chambre, another high court; and two new towers, the Tour Cesar and the Tour d'Argent, as well as a gallery connecting the palace to the Tour Bombec. The royal offices took their names from the different chambers, or rooms, of the palace; the Chambre des Comptes, chamber of the accounts, was the treasury of the kingdom, and the courts were divided between the Chambre civile and the Chambre criminelle.

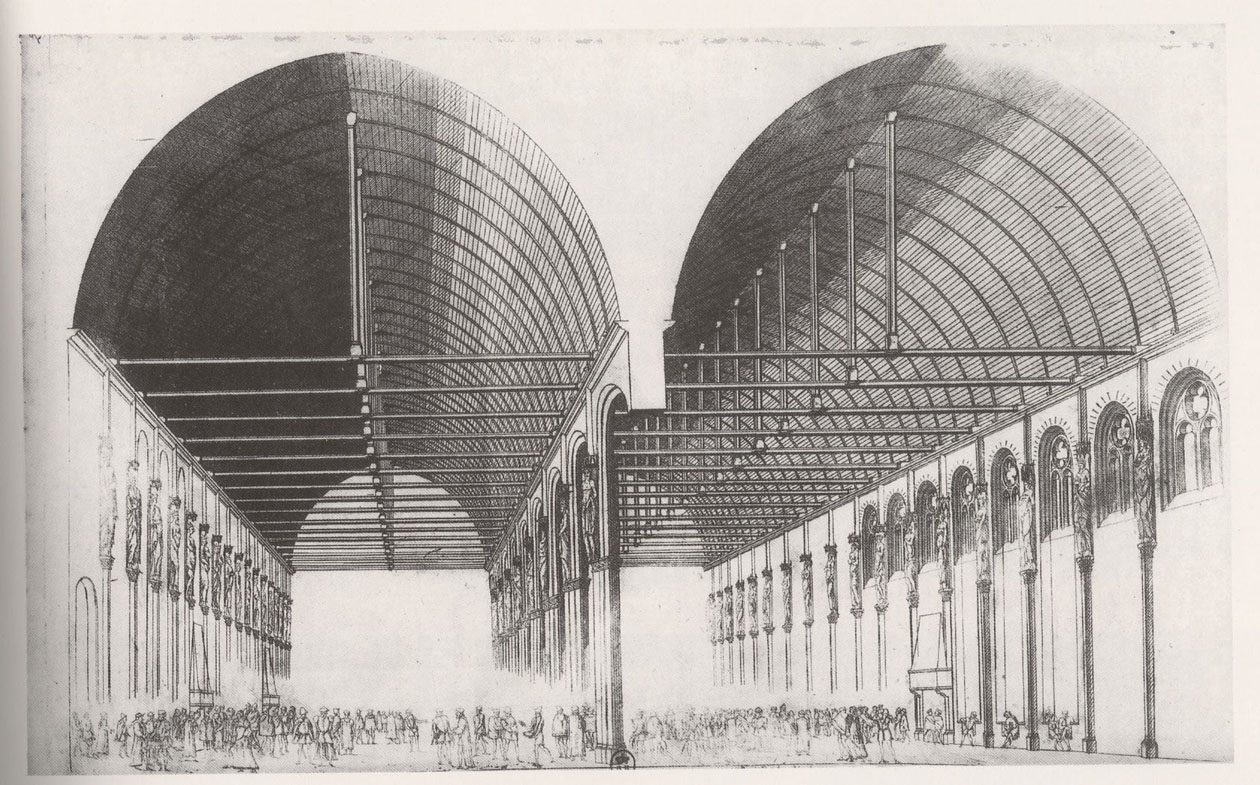
The Grand'Salle of the Palace in the 16th century, by Androuet du Cerceau

On the site of the old Salle de Roi he built a much larger and more richly decorated assembly hall, the Grand'Salle which had a double nave, each covered with a high arched wooden roof. A row of eight columns in the center of the hall supported the wooden framework of the roof. On each of the pillars, and on columns around the walls, were placed polychrome statues of the kings of France. In the center of the hall was an enormous table made of black marble from Germany, used for banquets, the taking of oaths, meetings of military high courts, and other official functions. A fragment of the table still exists, and is on display in the Conciergerie. The Grand'Salle was used for royal banquets, judicial proceedings, and theatrical performances.

At the west end of the island, where Place Dauphine is today, was a walled private garden, a bath house where the King could bathe in the water of the river, and a dock, from which the King could travel by boat to his other residences, the Louvre fortress on the right bank and the Tour de Nesle on the left bank.

The lower floor beneath the Grand'Salle contained the Salle des Gardes for the soldiers who protected the King, as well as the dining room for the household of the King, including officers, clerks, court officers and servants. High court officials had their own houses in the city, while lower officials and servants lived within the Palace. The household of the King at the time of Philip IV numbered about three hundred persons; counting the servants of the Queen and of the King's children, the number grew to about six hundred.

Philip made several further major changes to the palace. He reconstructed the south wall, and moved the wall on the east side to enlarge the ceremonial courtyard, The new wall, more that of a palace than a fortress, had two large gates and echauguettes, or small elevated posts for watchmen at the angles of the wall. He restored the Salle d'Eau, extended the logos de Roi, or royal residence further south, built a new building for Chambre des comptes, or royal treasury, and enlarged the garden. The works were almost complete when the King died in 1314. Philip's successors made a few further additions; John II (1319-1364) constructed new kitchens on two levels northwest of the Grand'Salle, and built a new square tower. Later, his son, Charles V (1338-1380) installed a clock in the tower, and it became known as the Tour de l'Horloge.

=== Late Middle Ages ===
The Hundred Years War between England and France changed the history and function of the palace. King John II was taken hostage by the English. In 1358 the leader of the Paris merchants, Etienne Marcel, led an uprising against royal authority. His soldiers invaded the palace, and, in the presence of the King's son, the future Charles V, they killed the King's counselors, Jean de Conflans and Robert de Clermont. The rebellion was abandoned and Marcel was killed, but when Charles V took the throne in 1364, he decided to move his residence a safe distance from the center of the city. He built a new residence, the Hôtel Saint-Pol, in the Marais quarter, close to the safety of the Bastille fortress; and later the Louvre Palace and then the Château de Vincennes became the royal residences.

The kings of France did not entirely abandon the palace. They returned frequently for ceremonies in the Grand'Salle, receptions for foreign monarchs, to preside over sessions of the Parlement of Paris, and to display the sacred relics at Saint-Chapelle for the veneration of the court. Until the 16th century, some of the kings made extended stays within the Palace. Nonetheless, the chief occupation of the palace became the administration of the treasury and especially of royal justice. It became the headquarters of the Parlement of Paris, which was not a legislative body but a high court of the nobility. The Parlement registered all royal decrees, and was the court of appeals for the nobility from decisions of royal tribunals. It met in the Grand'Chambre, with the king presiding. The management of the Palace became the responsibility of the Concierge, a high court official named by the king. At one point in the 15th century, the title belonged to Isabeau of Bavaria, the wife of King Charles VI. The palace gradually took its name from this official, and was called the Conciergerie.

As early as the 14th century, the Palace was also used to confine important prisoners, since it was not necessary to transfer them from the city's major prison at Châtelet for trial. Furthermore, the palace had its own torture chambers, used to encourage the rapid confessions of prisoners. By the 15th century the palace was one of the major prisons of Paris. The entrance of the prison was located on the main courtyard, the Cour du Mai, named for the tree that the clerks of the palace traditionally placed there every spring. The prison cells were located in the lower floors of the palace and in the towers, where the torture was also conducted. Prisoners were rarely kept there for a long time. As soon as judgement was given, they were taken briefly to the parvis in front of the Cathedral of Notre Dame to have their confession heard, then to their execution on the Place de Greve.

Notable prisoners held at the palace before their executions included Enguerrand de Marigny, the chancellor of Philip IV, who oversaw the construction of much of the palace, accused of corruption by the king's successor, Louis X; Gabriel de Lorges, Count of Montgomery, whose lance fatally wounded Henry II during a tournament, who was later accused of advocating religious reforms and disobedience to King Charles IX; François Ravaillac, the assassin of Henry IV; Marie-Madeleine d'Aubray, the marquise of Brinvilliers, a famous poisoner; the bandit Cartouche; and Robert-François Damiens, a Palace servant who tried to kill Louis XV. Jeanne of Valois-Saint-Rémy, the Countess de la Motte, the central figure in the notorious Affair of the Diamond Necklace, who plotted to defraud Marie Antoinette, was held there, whipped, branded with a V for Voleur (thief), then transferred to the Saltpétriére Prison for a life sentence, but escaped a few months later.

=== Early Modern Era ===
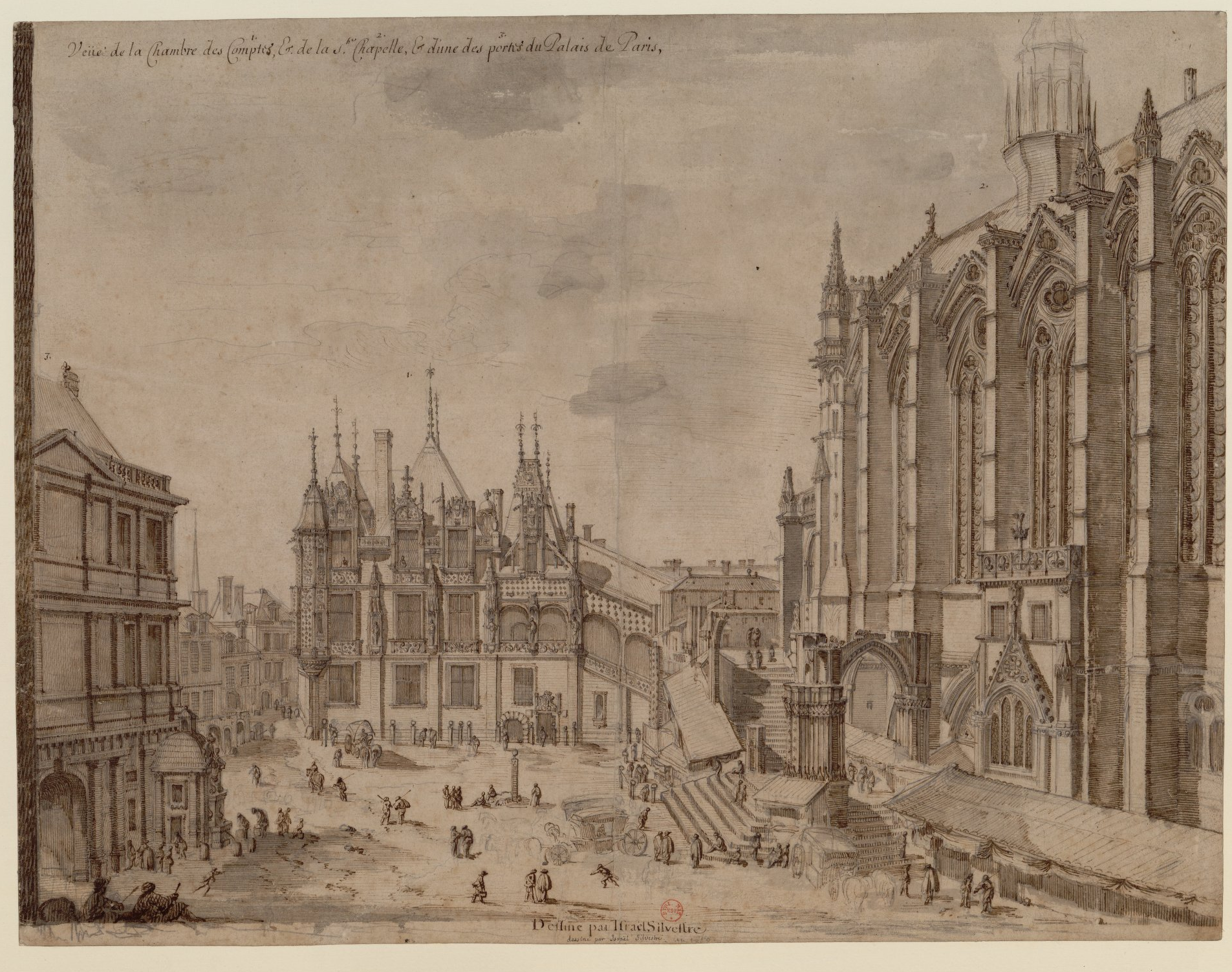
The Chambre de Comptes (center) and Sainte Chapelle (right) in about 1640

From the 14th through the 18th century, the kings of France made many modifications to the palace, particularly to Sainte-Chapelle. In 1383, Charles VI replaced the spire of Sainte-Chapelle, and, at the end of the century, an oratory was built on the outside of the chapel against the south wall. From 1490 to 1495, Charles VIII installed a new rose window on the western façade of the chapel. In 1504, Louis XII added a monumental stairway on the south side of the palace, and constructed a new building for the Chambre des comptes, the royal treasury. In 1585, Henry III added a sundial to the wall of the clock tower, and began the construction of the Pont Neuf, a new bridge to connect the island to the left and right banks of the Seine. In 1607, Henry IV gave up the royal garden at the end of the island and had a new residential square, Place Dauphine, constructed on the site. In 1611, Louis XIII had the banks of the river around the island rebuilt of stone.

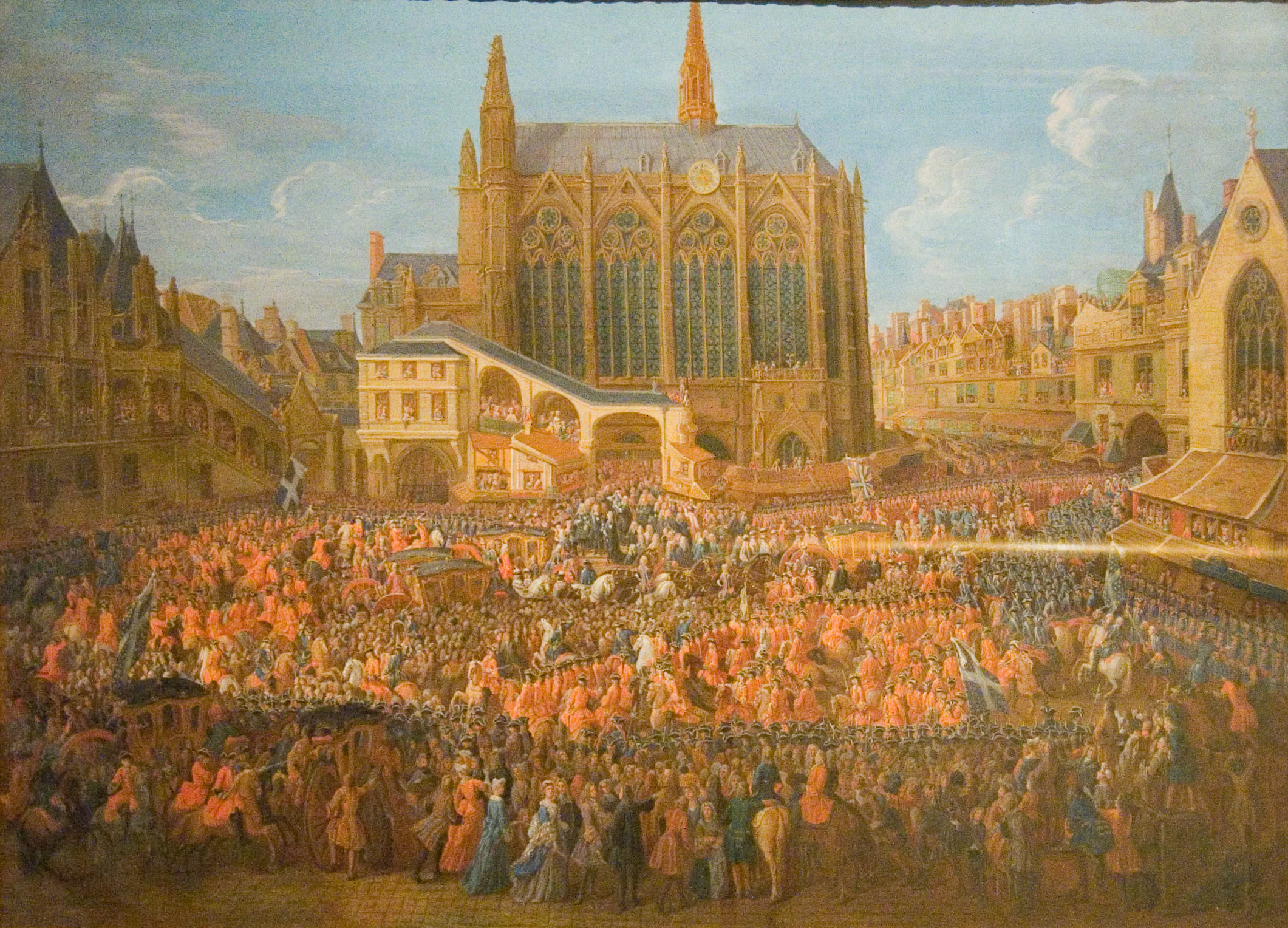
Louis XIV arrives at the Palais de la Cité to preside over a session of the Parlement of Paris (1715)

In 1618, a major fire destroyed the Grand'Salle. It was reconstructed following the same plan by Salomon de Brosse in 1622. In 1630 another fire destroyed the spire of Sainte-Chapelle, which was replaced in 1671. In 1671, King Louis XIV, always short of money for his grandiose projects, followed the earlier practice of Henry IV at Place Dauphine, and began dividing excess land around the palace into lots for new building. By the 18th century, the palace was completely surrounded by private houses and shops built right up against its walls.

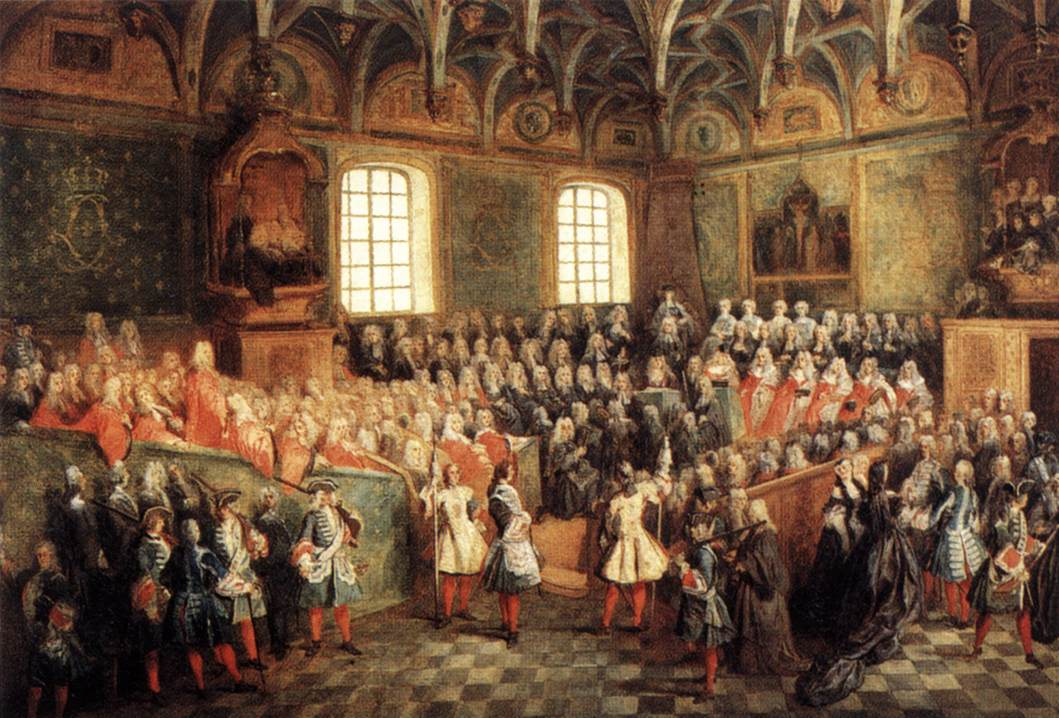
The Parlement of Paris meets as a high court in 1723

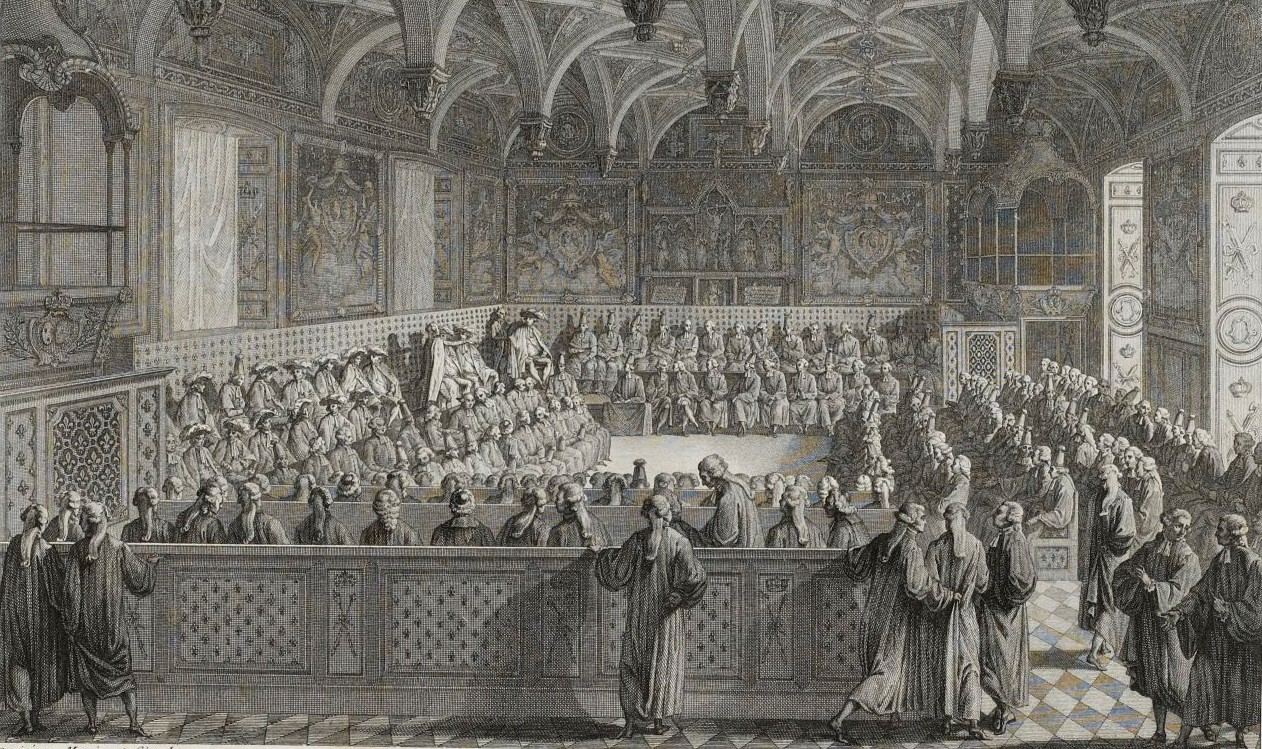
Session of the Parlement of Paris, attended by Louis XVI, in the Grand Chamber (19 November 1787)

In the late 17th and 18th centuries, the palace was struck by a series of natural catastrophes. The River Seine rose during the winter of 1689-1690, flooding the palace and causing considerable damage, including the destruction of the stained glass windows on the lower level of Sainte-Chapelle. In 1737, a fire destroyed the Cour de Comptes. The reconstruction of the building was accomplished by Jacques Gabriel, the father of Ange-Jacques Gabriel, architect of the Place de la Concorde. An even more serious fire occurred in 1776, causing serious damage to the residence of the King, the Grosse Tour, and the buildings around the Cour de Mai. In the reconstruction, the old Treasury of Chartres, the Grosse Tour and the eastern wall of the palace were demolished. A new face, the present façade, was given to what became known as the Palace of Justice; a new gallery was built at Sainte-Chapelle; a new chapel was constructed inside the Conciergerie to replace the oratory from the 12th century, and many new prison cells were constructed, which were to play a notorious role in the French Revolution.

=== Revolution and Terror ===
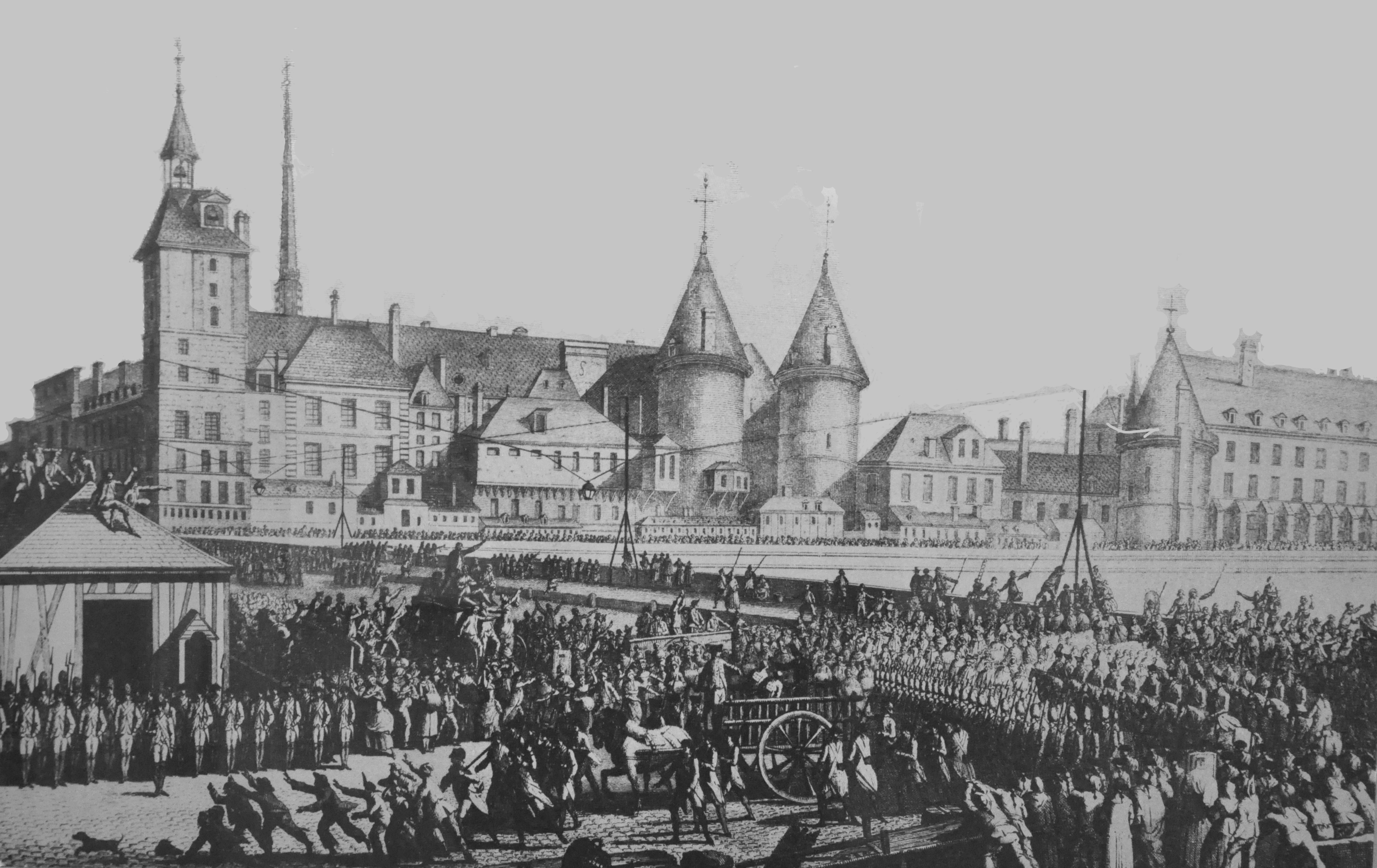
The Conciergerie during the Revolution (1790)

In the turbulent years before the French Revolution, one important center of opposition to the authority of the king, the Parlement of Paris, was found within the Conciergerie. In May, 1788, the nobles, who met in the Grand’Salle of the Conciergerie, refused to allow Louis XVI to launch an investigation of one of their members.

In July, 1789, after the storming of the Bastille, power passed to a new Constituent Assembly, which had little sympathy for the nobles of the Parlement of Paris. The Assembly put the Parlement on an indefinite vacation, and in 1790 the first elected mayor of Paris, Jean Sylvain Bailly, closed and sealed the offices of the Parlement.

The Revolution took a more radical turn in August 1792, when the first Paris Commune and the ’’Sans-culottes’’ seized the Tuileries Palace and arrested the King. In September, the ‘’sans-Culottes’’ massacred 1,300 prisoners in four days, including those held in the Conciergerie, who were killed in the ‘’Cour des Femmes’’, the yard where women prisoners were allowed to exercise.

The new revolutionary government of the Convention was soon divided into two factions, the more moderate Girondins and the more radical Montagnards, led by Robespierre. On March 10, 1793, Convention, over the opposition of the Girondins, ordered the creation of a Revolutionary Tribunal, with its headquarters in the Conciergerie. The tribunal met in the ‘’Grand’Salle’’, where the Parlement of Paris had held its meetings, which was renamed the ‘’Salle de la Liberte’’. It was headed by Antoine Quentin Fouquier-Tinville, a former state prosecutor, aided by a jury of twelve members. In the Convention, Robespierre had a new Law of Suspects passed, which deprived prisoners before the tribunal of most of their rights. There was no appeal to decisions of the tribunal, and sentences of death were carried out the same day.

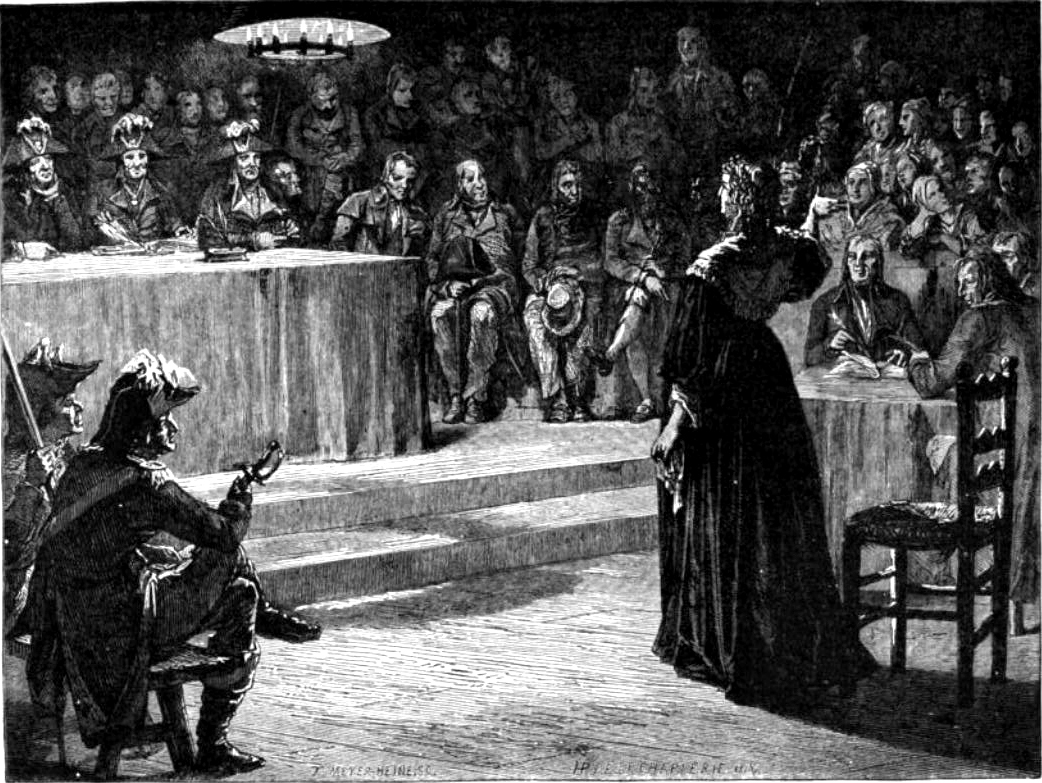
Marie Antoinette on trial before the Revolutionary Tribunal, after Hippolyte de la Charlerie, engraved by Jacob Meyer-Heine for Louis Blanc's Histoire de la Revolution

Among the first to be tried was Marie Antoinette, who had been held a prisoner for two and half months since the trial and execution of her husband, Louis XVI. She was tried on October 16, 1793 and executed on the same day. On October 24, twenty Girondin members of the Convention were put on trial for conspiring against the unity of the new Republic, and immediately executed. Others brought before the Tribunal and executed included Philippe Égalité, a cousin of the King, who had voted for the King's execution (November 6); Bailly, the first elected Mayor of Paris; (November 11), and Madame du Barry, a favorite of the King's grandfather, Louis XV (December 8).

Prisoners rarely spent a long time in the Conciergerie; most were brought there a few days or at the most a few weeks before their trial. There were as many as six hundred prisoners there at a time; a small number of wealthy prisoners were given their own cells, but most were crowded into large common cells, with straw on the floor. At dawn the cell doors were opened the prisoners were allowed to exercise in the courtyard or in the corridors. Women prisoners went to a separate courtyard with a fountain, where they could wash their clothes. Prisoners gathered at the foot of Bonbec Tower each evening to hear the guards read the names of those who would be brought before the Tribunal the next day. Those whose names were announced were traditionally given a meager banquet with other prisoners that night.

Soon the Tribunal tried anyone who opposed Robespierre. Jacques Hébert, Danton, Camille Desmoulins, and many others were brought before the Tribunal, judged and executed. So many opponents of Robespierre were arrested that the Tribunal began trying them in groups. By July 1794 an average of thirty-eight persons a day were judged and guillotined. Gradually, however, opposition grew against Robespierre, who was accused of wishing to be a dictator. He was arrested on July 28, 1794, after trying unsuccessfully to shoot himself. He was taken to the infirmary of the Conciergerie, then, a few hours later, tried by the Tribunal, and executed on the Place de la Revolution. The chief of the Tribunal, Fouquier-Tinville, was arrested, and after nine months in prison in the Conciergerie, was also executed on May 9, 1795. The Revolutionary Tribunal was abolished on May 7, 1795, after having put to death 2,780 persons in 718 days.

=== 19th, 20th and 21st centuries ===
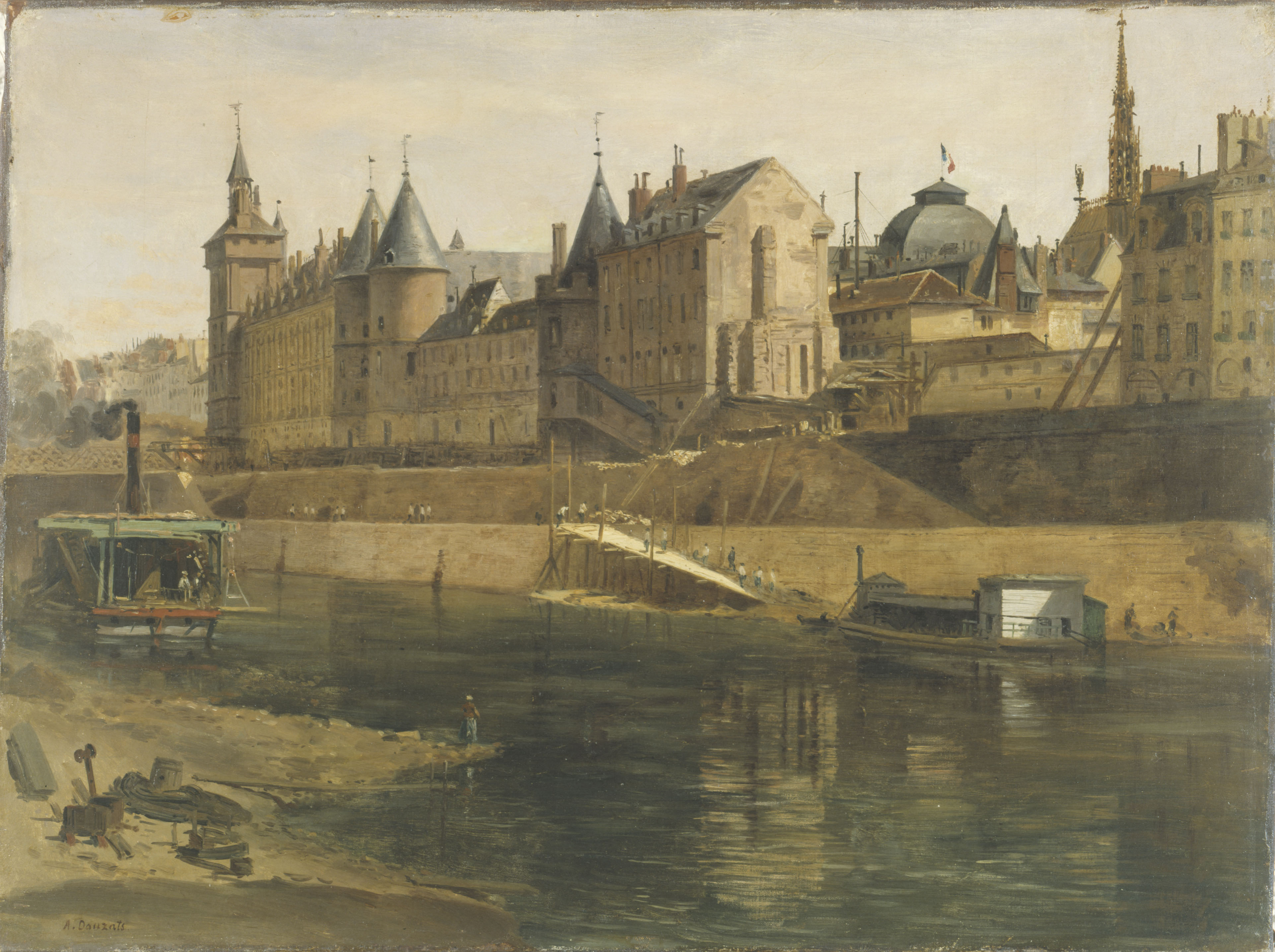
The Palais in 1858, by Adrien Dauzats

Following the Revolution, the Palace became the headquarters of the judicial system of France, but also continued its vocation as a prison. During the Consulate of Napoleon Bonaparte, the rebel Georges Cadoudal was imprisoned there until his execution in 1804. After Napoleon's downfall, one of his most famous generals, Marshal Michel Ney, was imprisoned there before his execution in 1815, as was Napoleon's nephew, Louis-Napoleon Bonaparte, the future Napoleon III, after his failed attempt to overthrow King Louis Philippe. The anarchists Giuseppe Fieschi and Felice Orsini, who tried respectively to kill Louis-Philippe and Napoleon III, were both imprisoned there, as was another famous anarchist, Ravachol, who was executed in 1892.

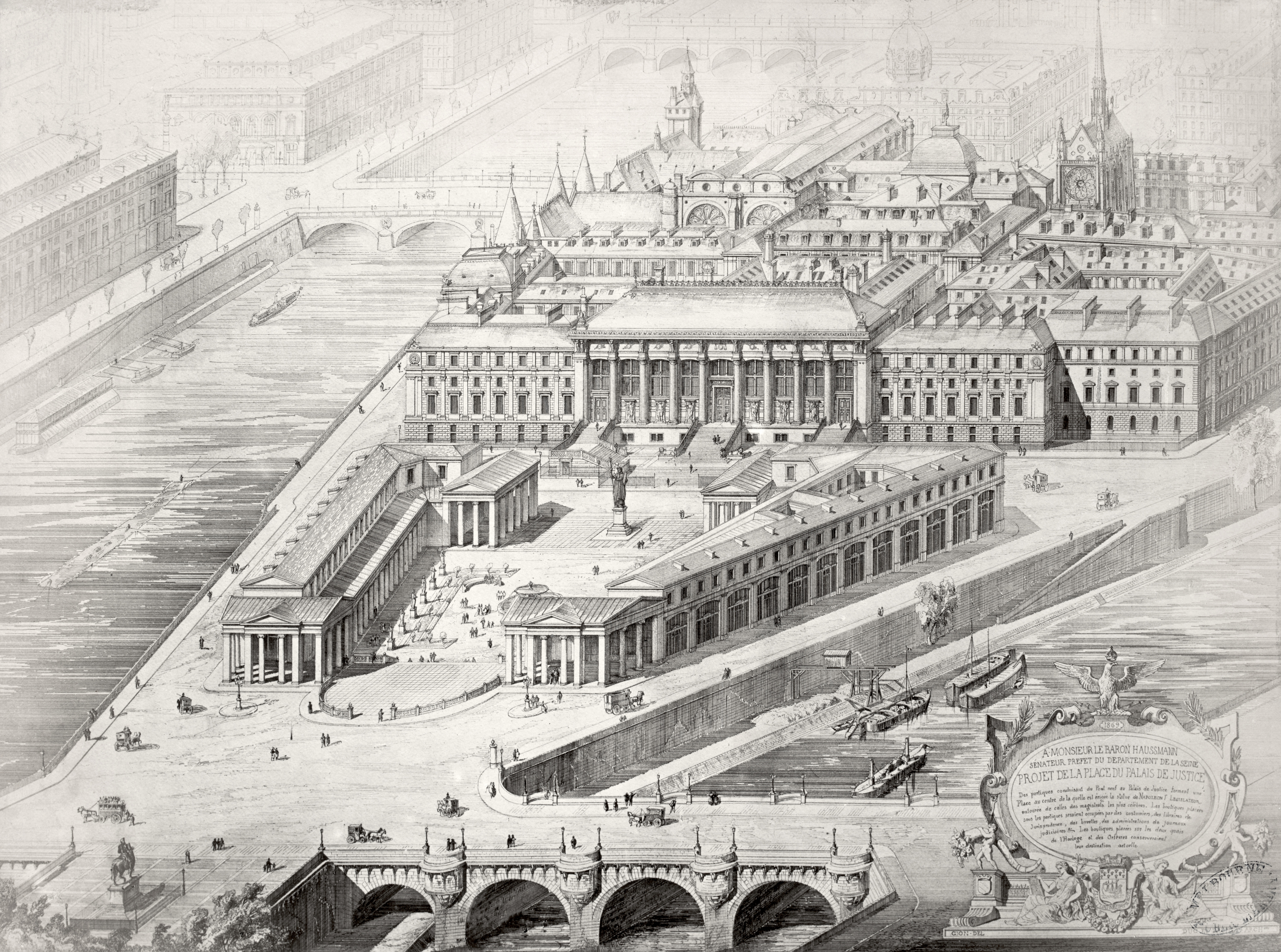
Project to open the perspective in front of the western front by demolishing the Place Dauphine, by Duc and Daumet, 1868

During the Revolution, the Sainte-Chapelle had been turned into a storage vault for legal documents, and half of the stained glass removed. Between 1837 and 1863, a major campaign was begun to restore the chapel to its medieval splendor. At the same time, the Conciergerie and Palace of Justice underwent major changes. Between 1812 and 1819, architect Antoine-Marie Peyre restored the vaulted ceiling of the old Salle des Gens d'Armes, and also, at the request of the restored King Louis XVIII, built an expiatory chapel where the cell of Marie-Antoinette had been. Between 1820 and 1828, he built a new façade for the Conciergerie along the Seine between the Tour de l'Horloge and the Tour Bonbec. In 1836, a new entrance was to the Conciergerie was made between the Tour d'Argent and the Tour César.

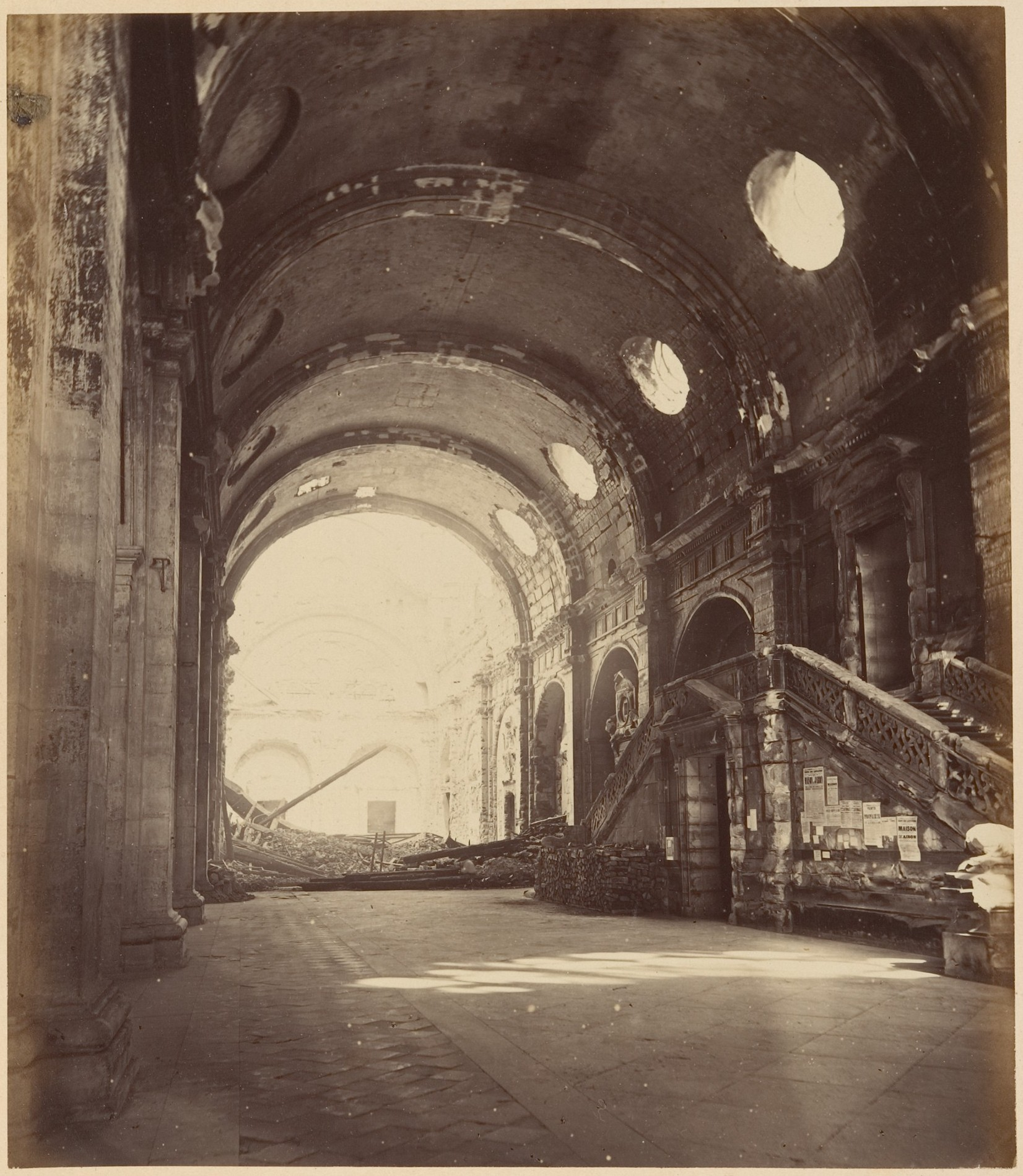
The ruins of the Palace of Justice after the Paris Commune (1871)

A comprehensive plan for the remodeling of the Palais de la Cité was designed from 1835 by architect Jean-Nicolas Huyot, who started its execution until his death in 1840. This was continued mainly by Joseph-Louis Duc assisted first by Etienne Theodore Dommey (1801-1872) and, from 1867, by Honoré Daumet who upon Duc's death in 1879 succeeded him as the complex's chief architect. The plan entailed the demolition of some of the remaining vestiges of the old palace, including what remained of the Logis du Roi and the Salle sur l'eau, and the construction of the new building for the Cour de Cassation.

Under Emperor Napoleon III, the western section was reconstructed between 1857 and 1868 by Joseph-Louis Duc and Honoré Daumet. The exterior includes sculptural work by Jean-Marie Bonnassieux. It was opened in October 1868 by Baron Haussmann, prefect of the Seine. It was awarded the Grand Prix de l'Empereur as the greatest work of art produced in France in the decade.

In 1871, in the final days of the Paris Commune, the Communards set the building on fire, destroying a large part of the interior. Restoration was undertaken by Joseph-Louis Duc. Duc also finished the Harlay façade, while architect Honoré Daumet completed the building of the Court of Appeals. After the death of Duc 1879, Honoré Daumet took over the project. The Palais de Justice was substantially completed in 1914, just before the beginning of the First World War in 1914, The final section to be finished being the Tribunal Correctionel (criminal court) on the southern side.

The Conciergerie was declared a national historical monument in 1862, and some rooms were opened to the public in 1914. It continued to function as a prison until 1934.

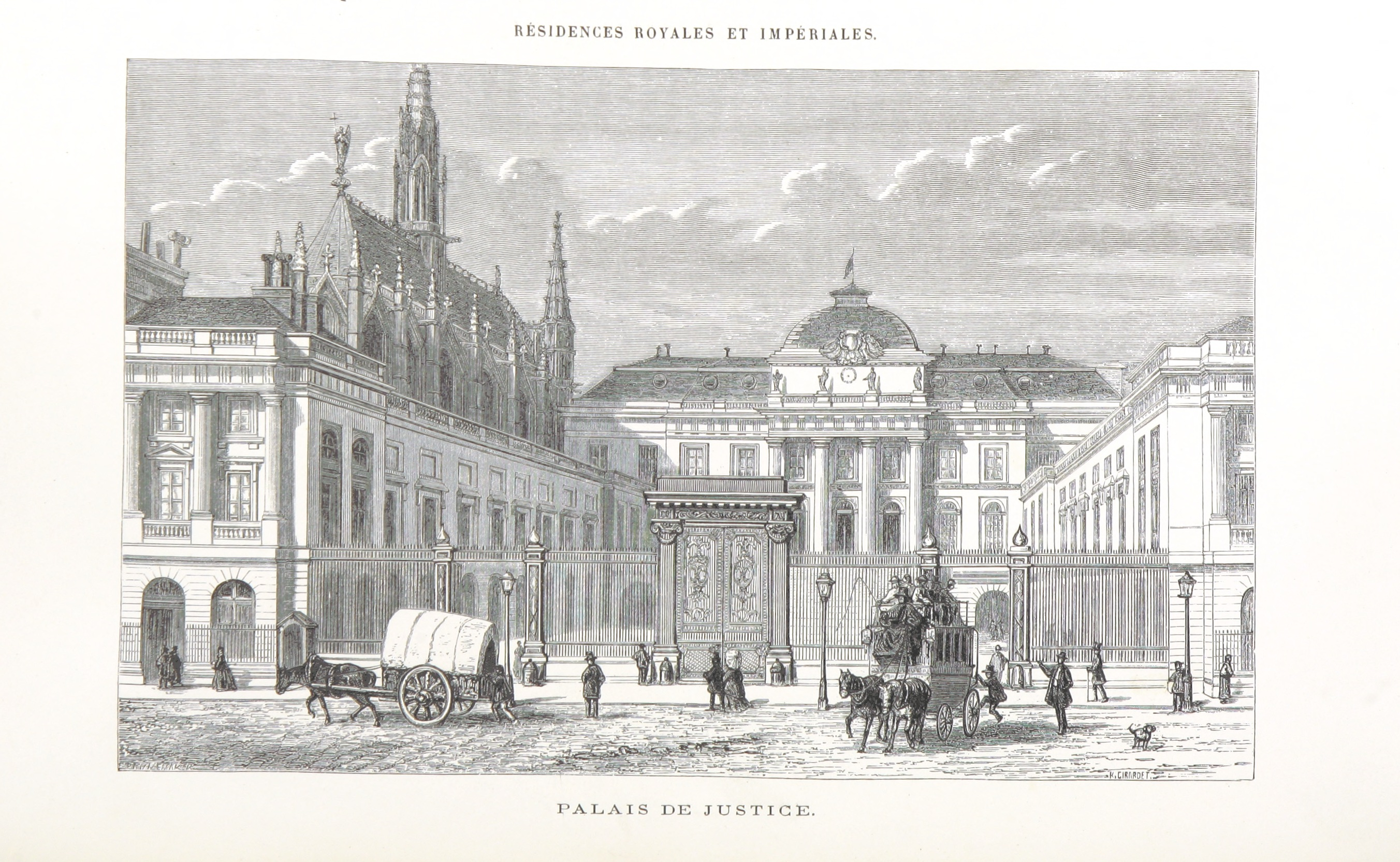
Courtyard and new façade of the Palace of Justice (1860)

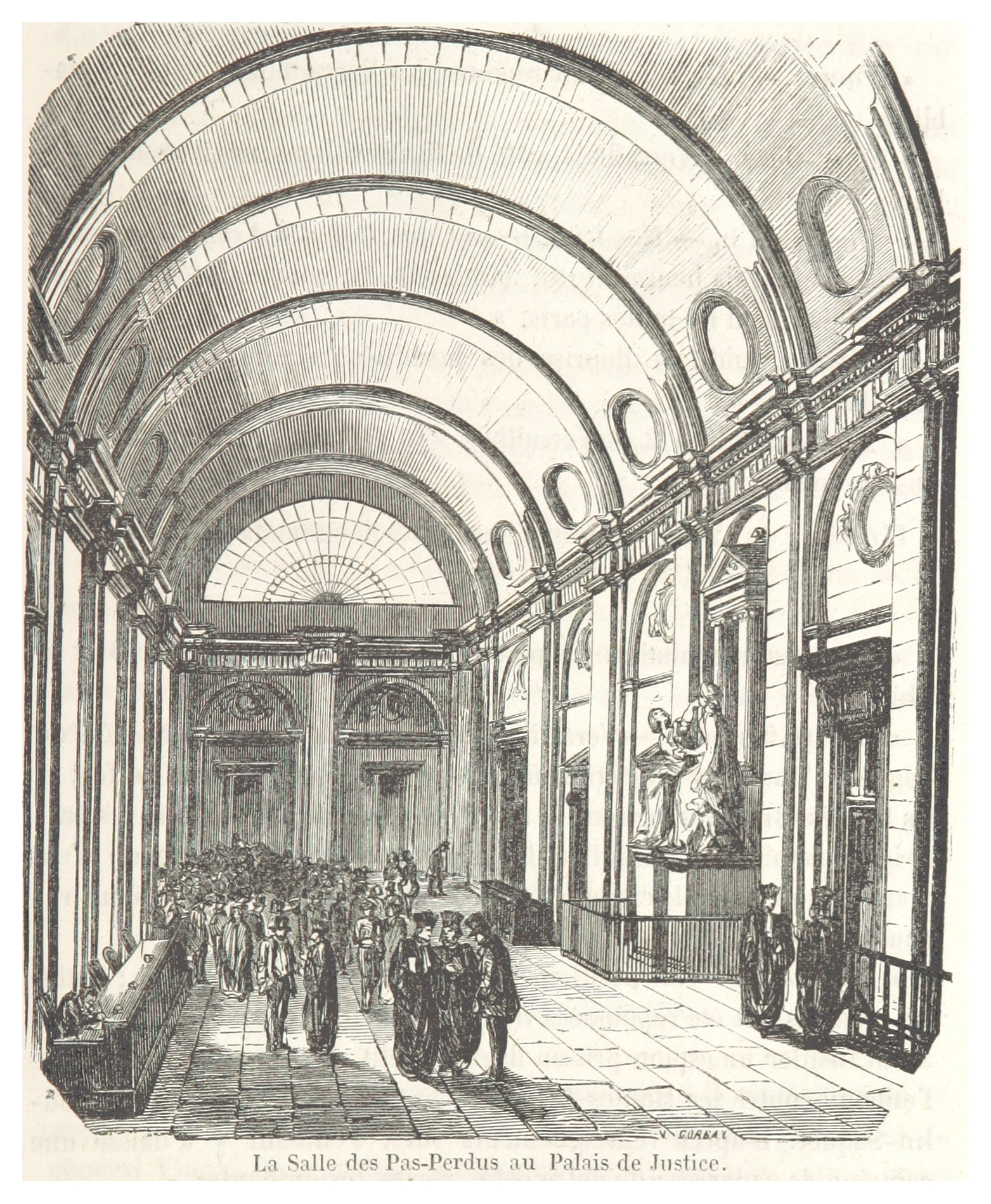
Salle des Pas Perdus, or main hallway, in the new Palace of Justice (1871)

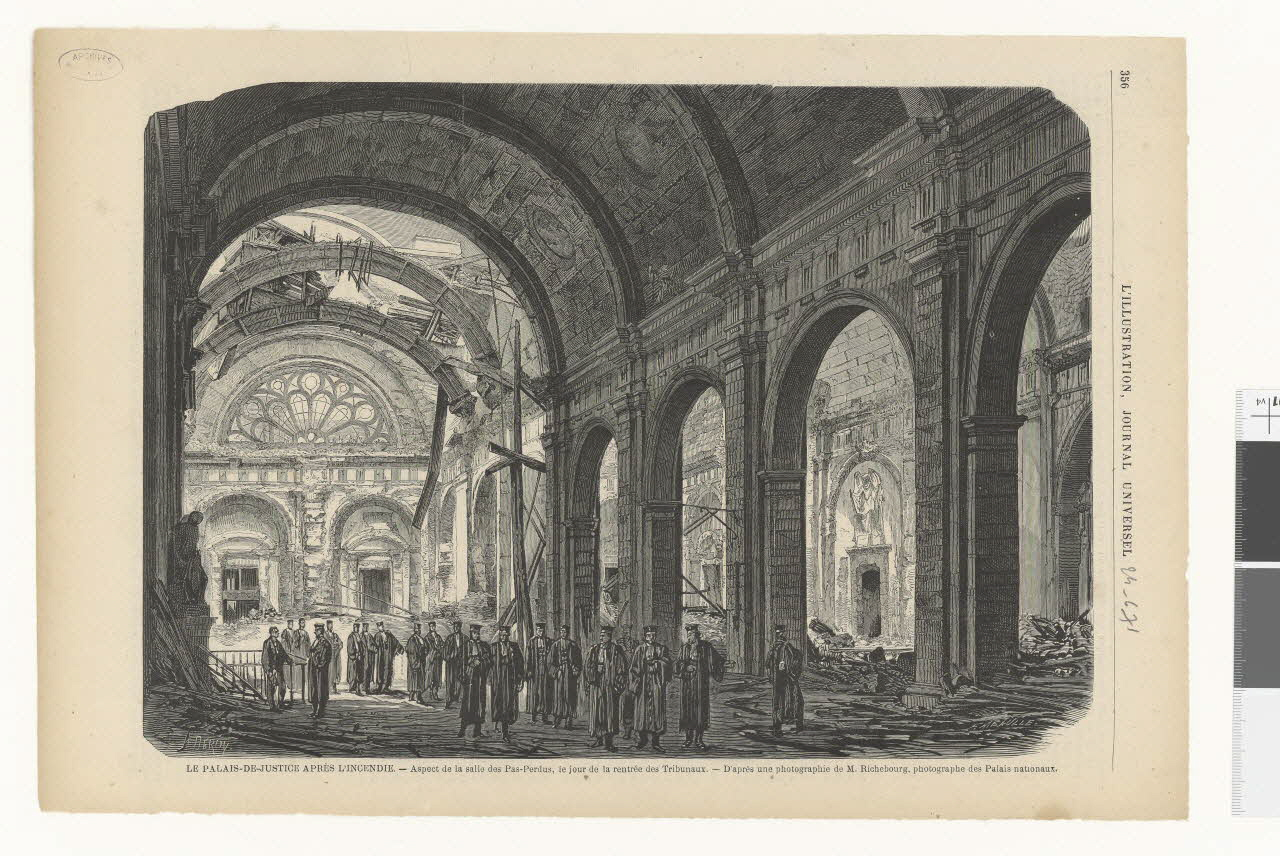
Main hallway after the fire set by Paris Commune

== Description ==
=== Cour du Mai and eastern exterior façades ===
The Cour du Mai is the main open space of the palace. It was formerly accessible through a fortified gate and now borders the Boulevard du Palais from which it is separated from an ornate iron fence by Master Bigonnet (1787, repaired in 1877). The current façades of the Cour du Mai date from the 1780s following the devastating fire of 1776. The main (western) front features a monumental stairway (the former grands degrés or Perron du Roi) leading to a square-domed building decorated with four Tuscan columns topped by allegorical statues: from south to north, Abundance by Pierre-François Berruer, Justice and Prudence by Félix Lecomte, and Force by Berruer. Above them is a royal coat of arms supported by two winged genies, by sculptor Augustin Pajou. The design of the Cour du Mai, including that of the iron fence, was by Pierre Desmaisons with the assistance of Jacques Denis Antoine and Joseph-Abel Couture especially for interiors. Its side wings were rebuilt in the same style during the 1840s.

To the immediate north of the Cour du Mai, the Boulevard du Palais borders the former main wing of the royal residence of the 14th century, with the Salle des Gens d'Armes on the ground floor (now slightly below the Boulevard's level) and the Salle des Pas-Perdus (formerly the Grande Salle) on the first floor.

At the complex's northeastern corner stands the 47-meter tall Tour de l'Horloge ("Clock Tower") built around 1353 under King John II. At the top of the tower was a bell, the tocsin du palais ("alarm bell of the palace"), which rang for several days to announce major dynastic events such as the death of kings and birth of firstborn royal sons, and also rang the signal of the Saint Bartholomew's Day Massacre in 1572; it was removed and melted down in 1792 and replaced in 1848. On the Boulevard's side it is decorated with the namesake monumental clock, which was the first public clock in Paris, made by Henri de Vic in 1370-1371. The clock was redecorated in 1585-1586 by Germain Pilon and restored several times since then, most heavy-handedly in 1849-1852 by Armand Toussaint following heavy damage during the French Revolution, and again in 1909, 1952, and most recently in 2012. It bears two monumental inscriptions in Latin: at the top, QVI DEDIT ANTE DVAS TRIPLICEM DABIT ILLE CORONAM ("He [God] Who already gave [King Henry III] two crowns [of Poland in 1573 and France in 1574] will give [him] a [heavenly] third one"); at the bottom, MACHINA QVÆ BIS SEX TAM JVSTE DIVIDIT HORAS JVSTITIAM SERVARE MONET LEGES QVE TVERI ("This machine that so justly divides twelve hours teaches to maintain Justice and to watch over the laws").

To the south of the Cour du Mai's fence, a plaque marks the former location of the Chapelle Saint-Michel (Saint Michael's Chapel) which gave its name to the nearby Pont Saint-Michel and, across the Seine, the Place Saint-Michel and Boulevard Saint-Michel, and was the headquarters of the Order of Saint Michael from 1470 to 1555 or 1557, when it was transferred to the Château de Vincennes.

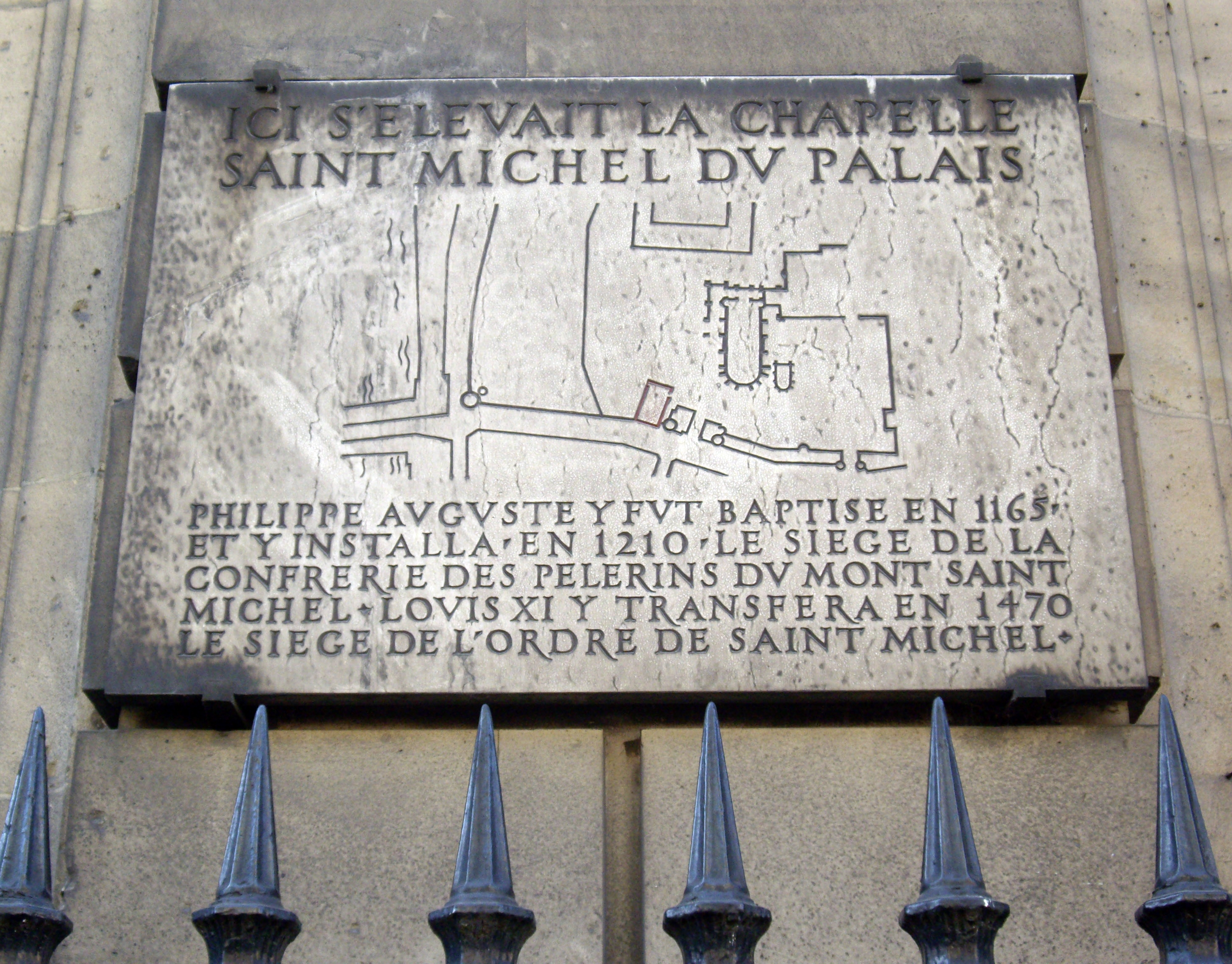
Plaque on former Chapelle Saint-Michel

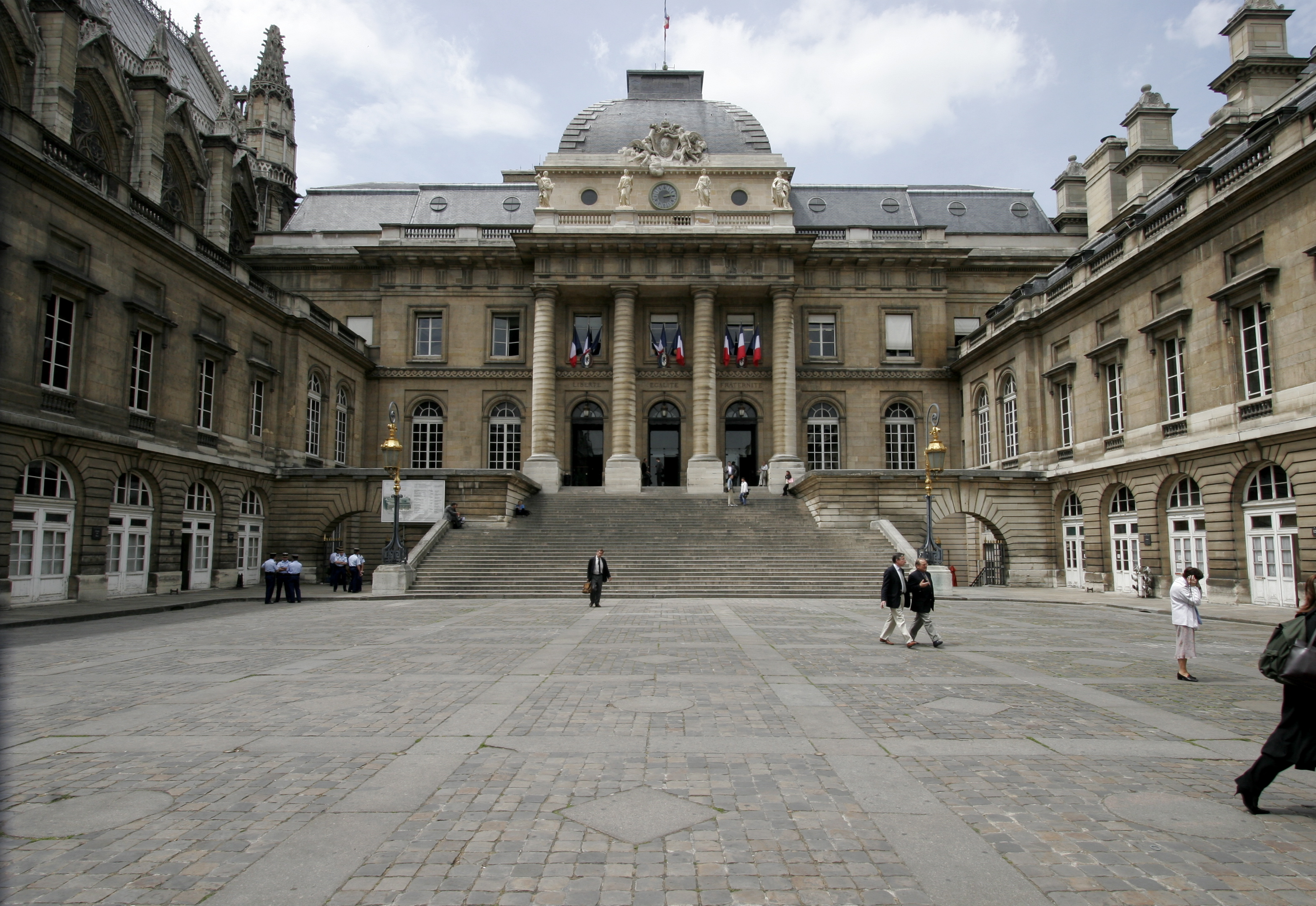
Cour du Mai

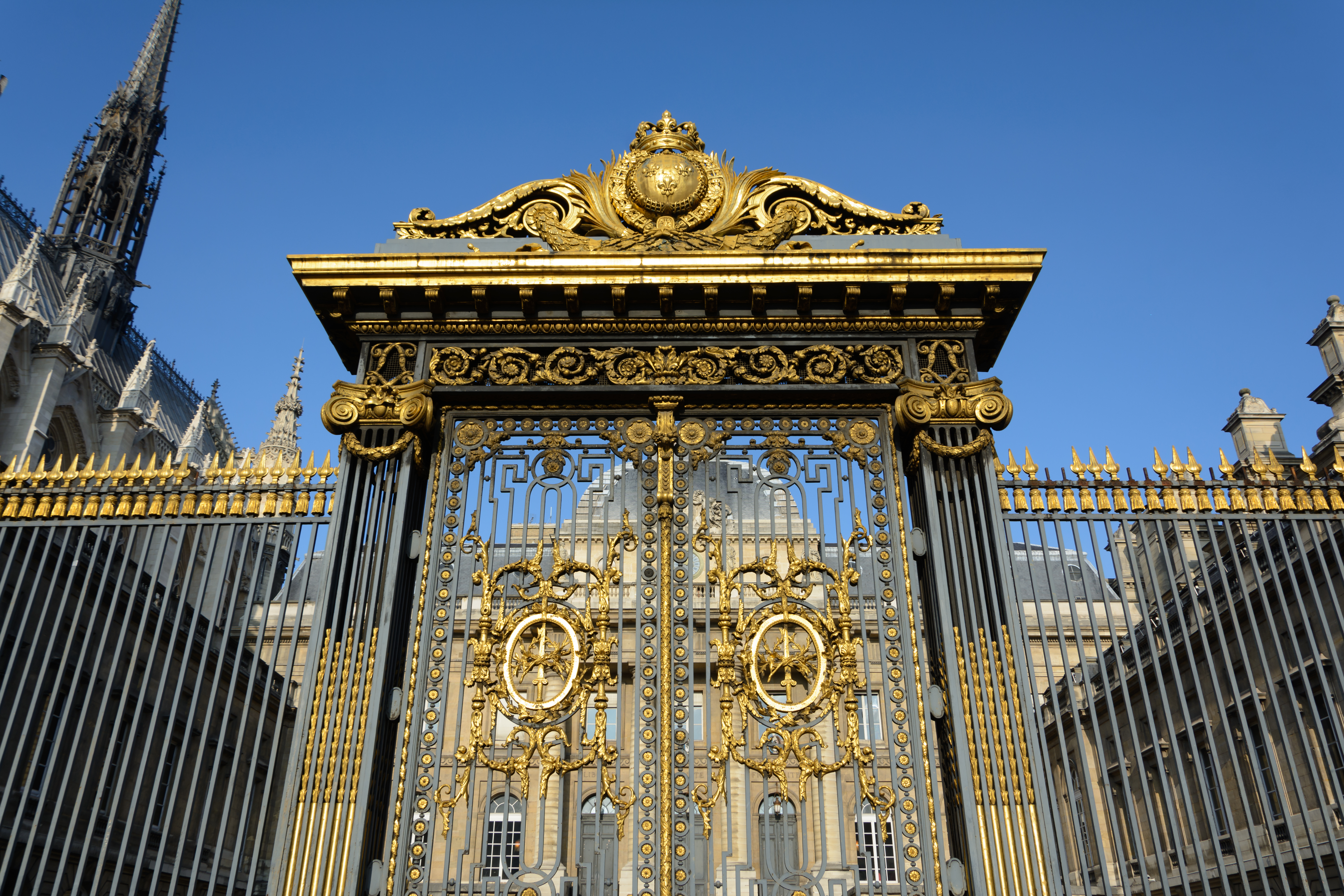
Iron gate of 1787

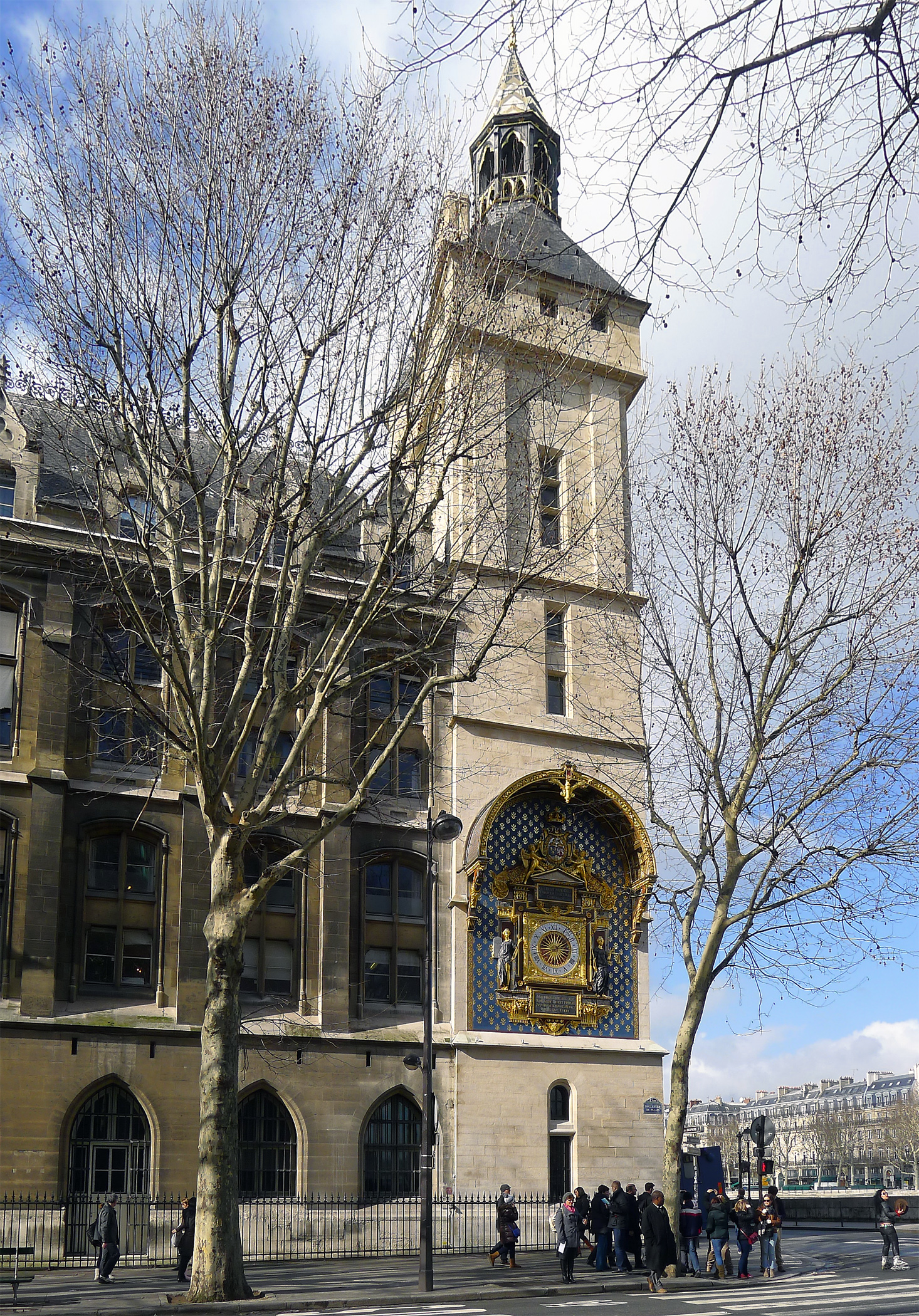
Tour de l'Horloge

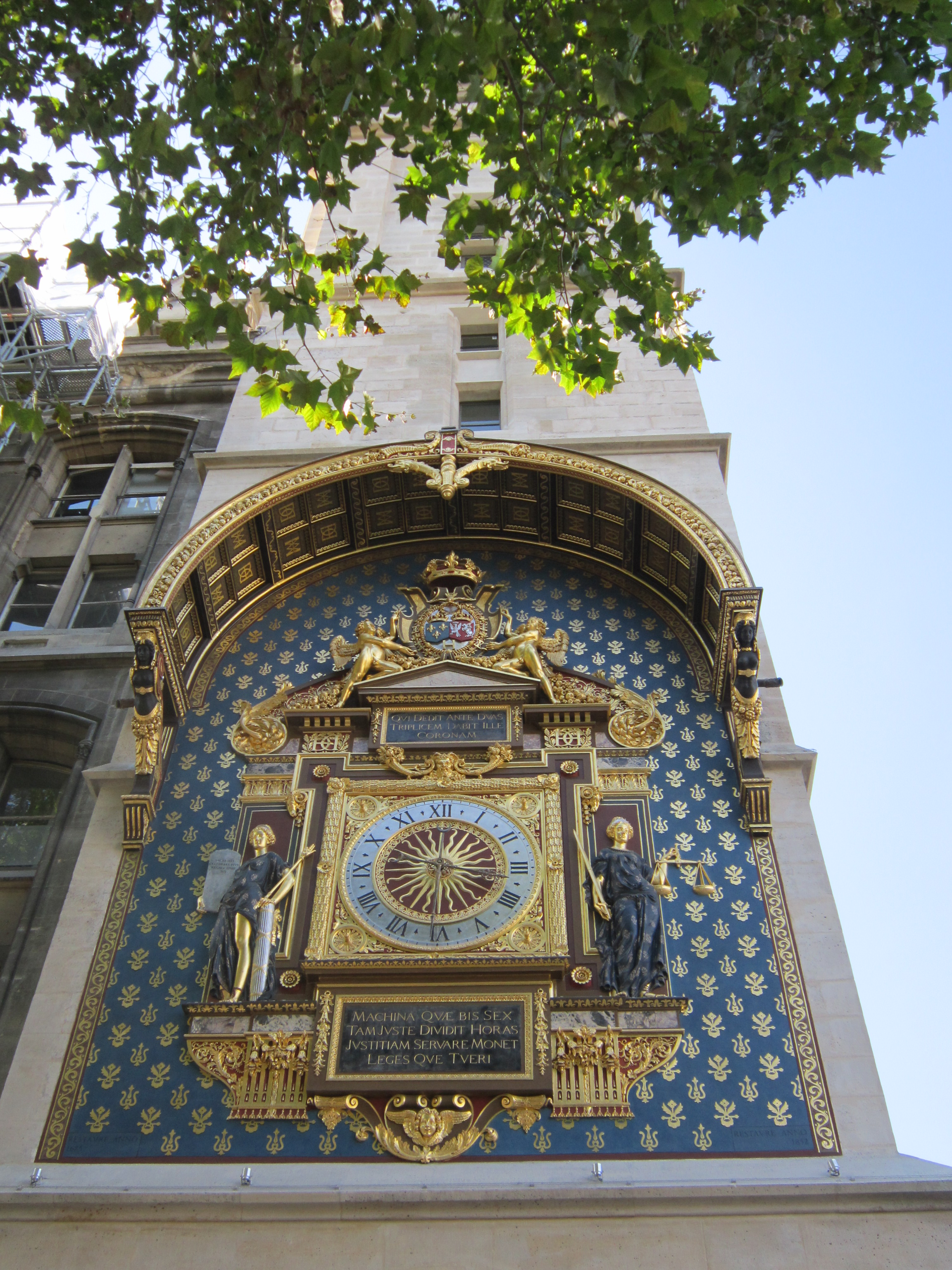
Monumental clock

=== Northern exterior façade ===
On the northern side facing the Seine, the building is framed by a succession of medieval towers and 19th-century façades:

- The Tour de l'Horloge built in the mid-14th century
- A neo-Gothic wing designed by Joseph-Louis Duc and built in the 1850s
- The twin towers formerly known as Tournelle Civile and Tournelle Criminelle referring to the respective civil and criminal jurisdictions located therein, more often referred to since an uncertain date as Tour de César ("Caesar's Tower") and Tour d'Argent ("Silver Tower"), built in the early 14th century
- A second neo-Gothic wing by Duc, on a similar but not identical design to the eastern one, built around 1860 and identically repaired following the 1871 fire
- The Tour Bonbec, whose name alludes to the former torture chambers inside, initially built in the mid-13th century. It was always the only crenellated tower of the palace. It was shorter than the other towers until the 1860s, when Duc added the upper level and removed the exterior staircase. Its upper parts were repaired after the 1871 fire, then again in 1935 following another fire in the attic.
- The northern side of the neo-Renaissance Cour de Cassation, initially designed by Louis Lenormand from 1838 to his death in 1862, executed by Joseph-Louis Duc and Étienne Theodore Dommey who directed the building's completion, then identically rebuilt following serious damage by the 1871 fire and completed in 1881. The decoration includes two children bearing a cartouche with a mirror-and-snake motif, by Henri Chapu; four caryatid allegories respectively of Prudence, Justice, Innocence, and Force, by Eugène-Louis Lequesne; and on the upper pediment, the Imperial arms surrounded by two allegorical groups, Law protecting Innocence and Law punishing Crime, by Louis-Léon Cugnot.
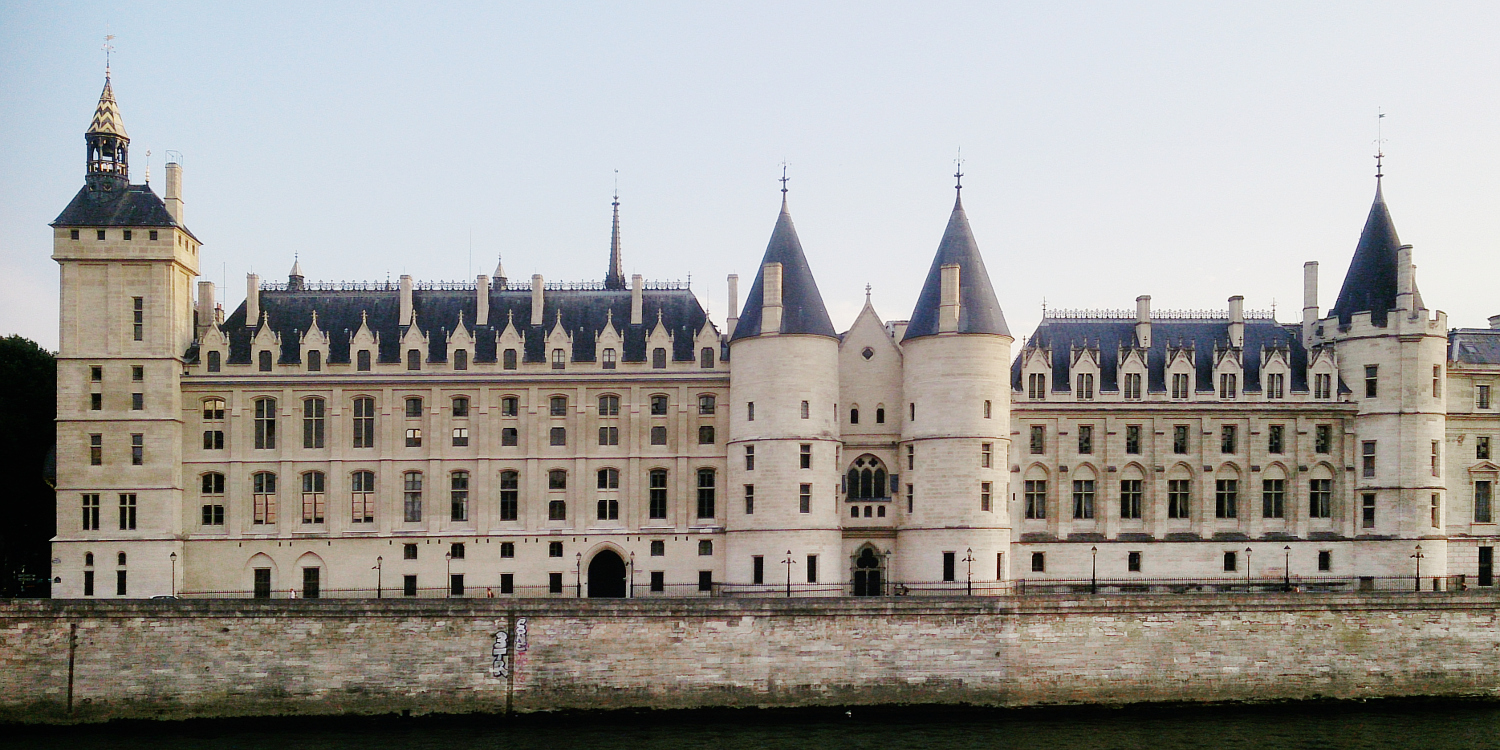
Medieval towers and neo-Gothic wings in between

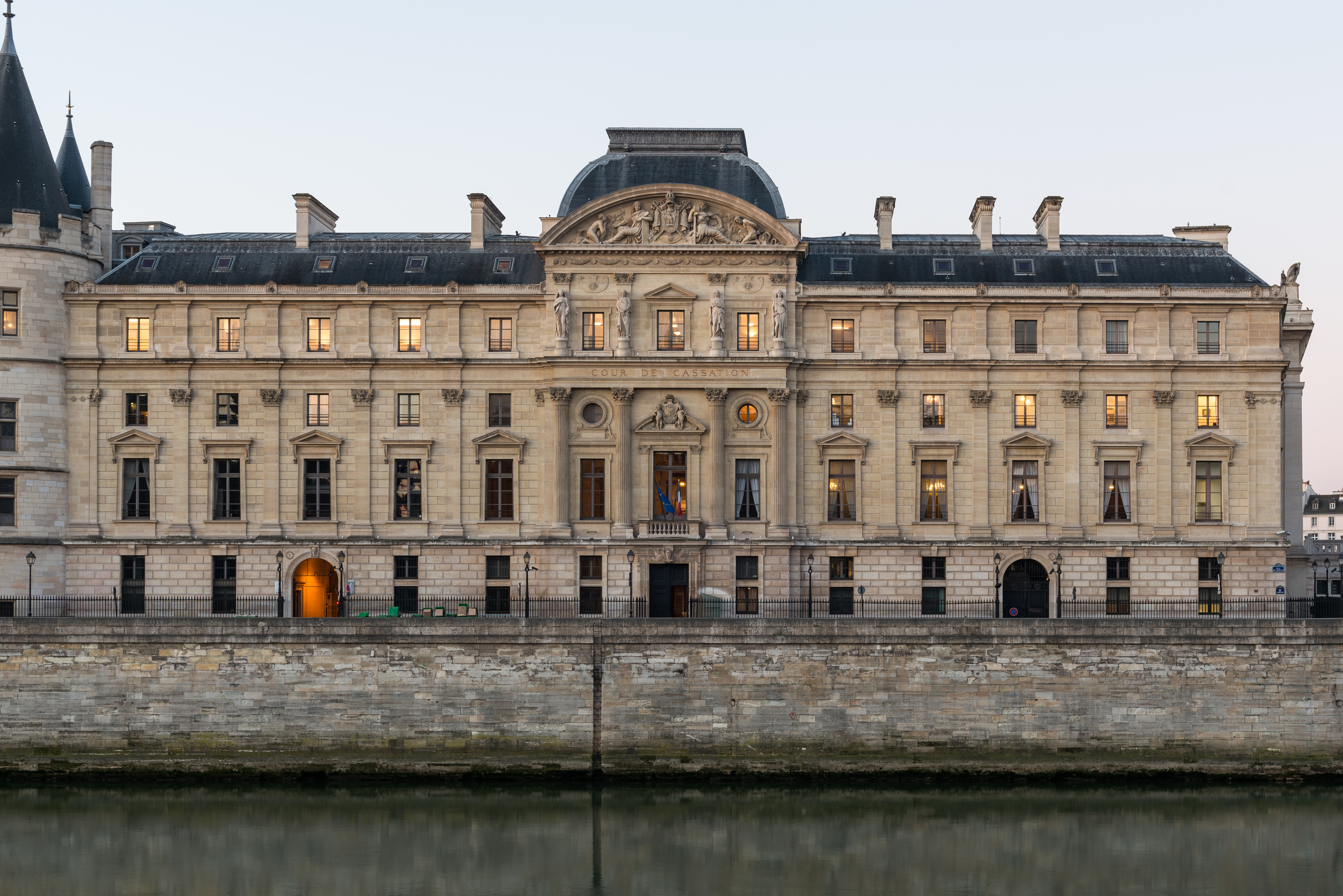
Cour de Cassation

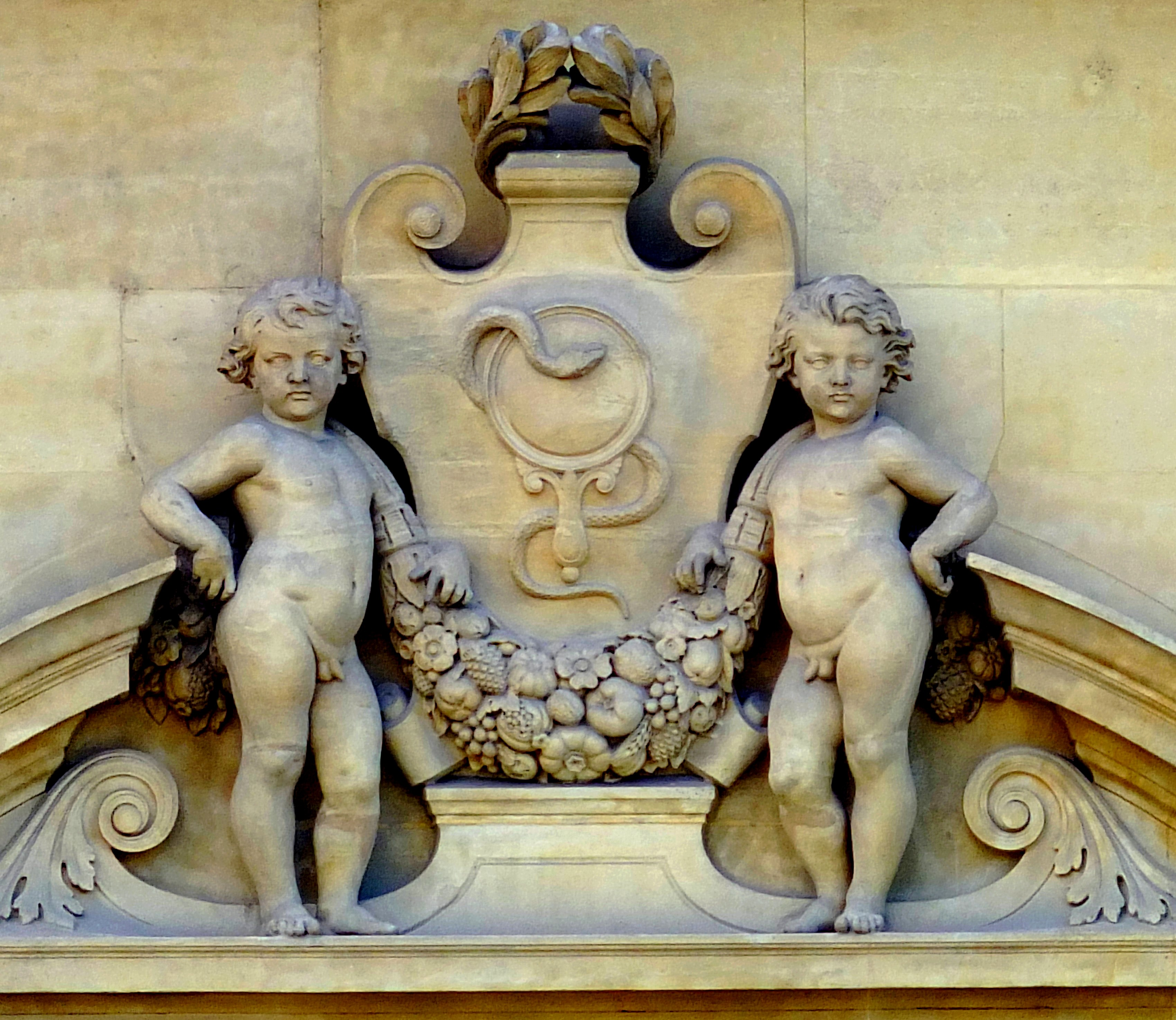
Decoration detail: mirror and snake, traditional attributes of prudence

=== Western exterior façade ===
Most of the Western front is a monumental composition designed from 1847 by Joseph-Louis Duc and Etienne Theodore Dommey for the Cour d'assises, built from 1857 to 1868, then repaired after the 1871 fire and finally inaugurated in 1875. It faces Place Dauphine, whose early-17th-century eastern side was demolished in 1874 to free up space in front of the new building. The style of its decoration is neo-Classical, but the overall design was inspired by Ancient Egyptian architecture and specifically by the façade of the Dendera Temple complex. The monumental statues are, from north to south: Prudence and Truth by Auguste Dumont, Punishment and Protection by François Jouffroy, and Force and Equity by Jean-Louis Jaley. The stylized lions that guard the stairs and represent public force are by Isidore Bonheur (1866). On the façade's extremities are two bas-relief medallions of the great code creators, respectively Napoleon for the Napoleonic Code and Justinian I for the Code of Justinian.

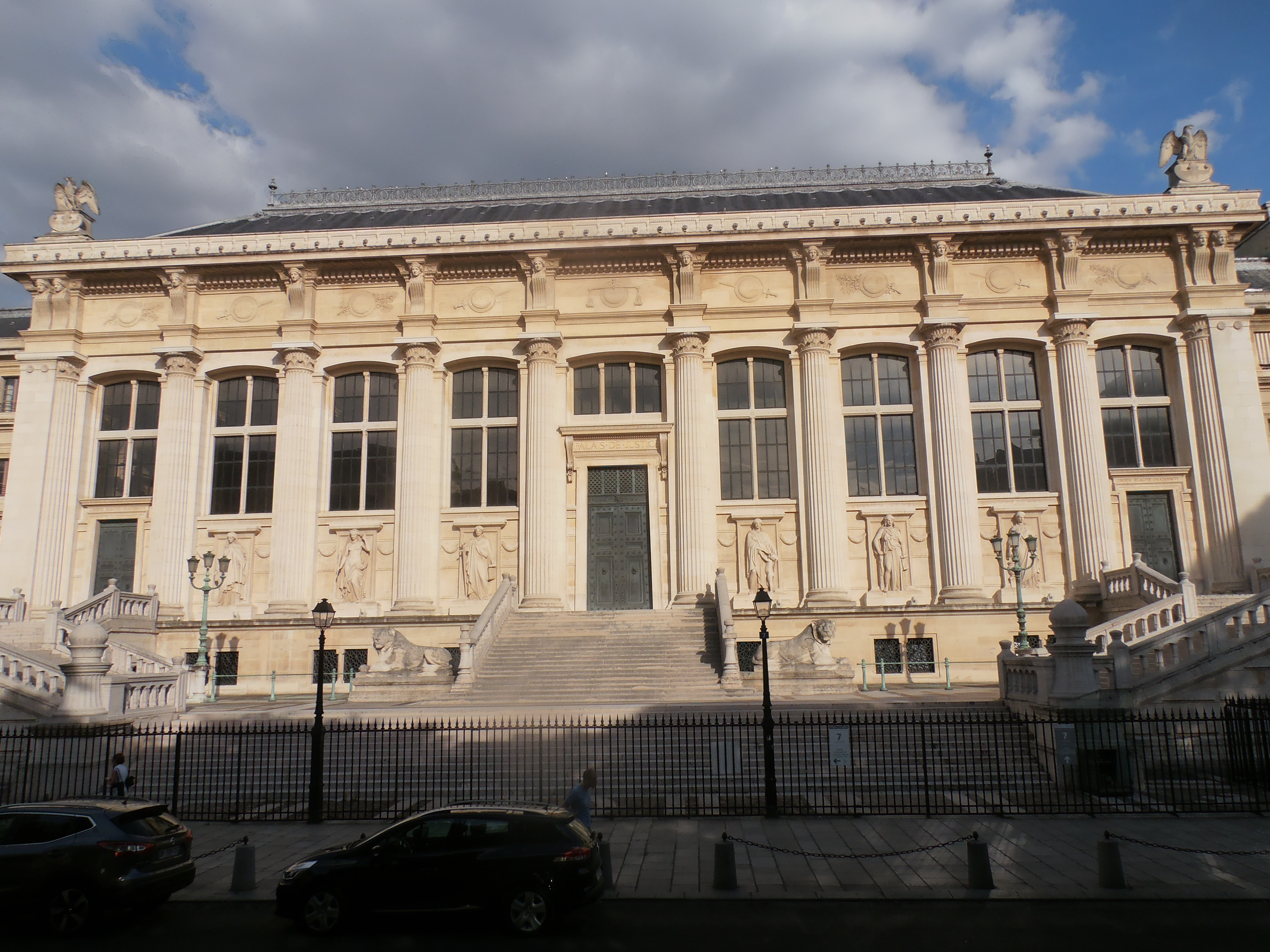
West façade, central wing

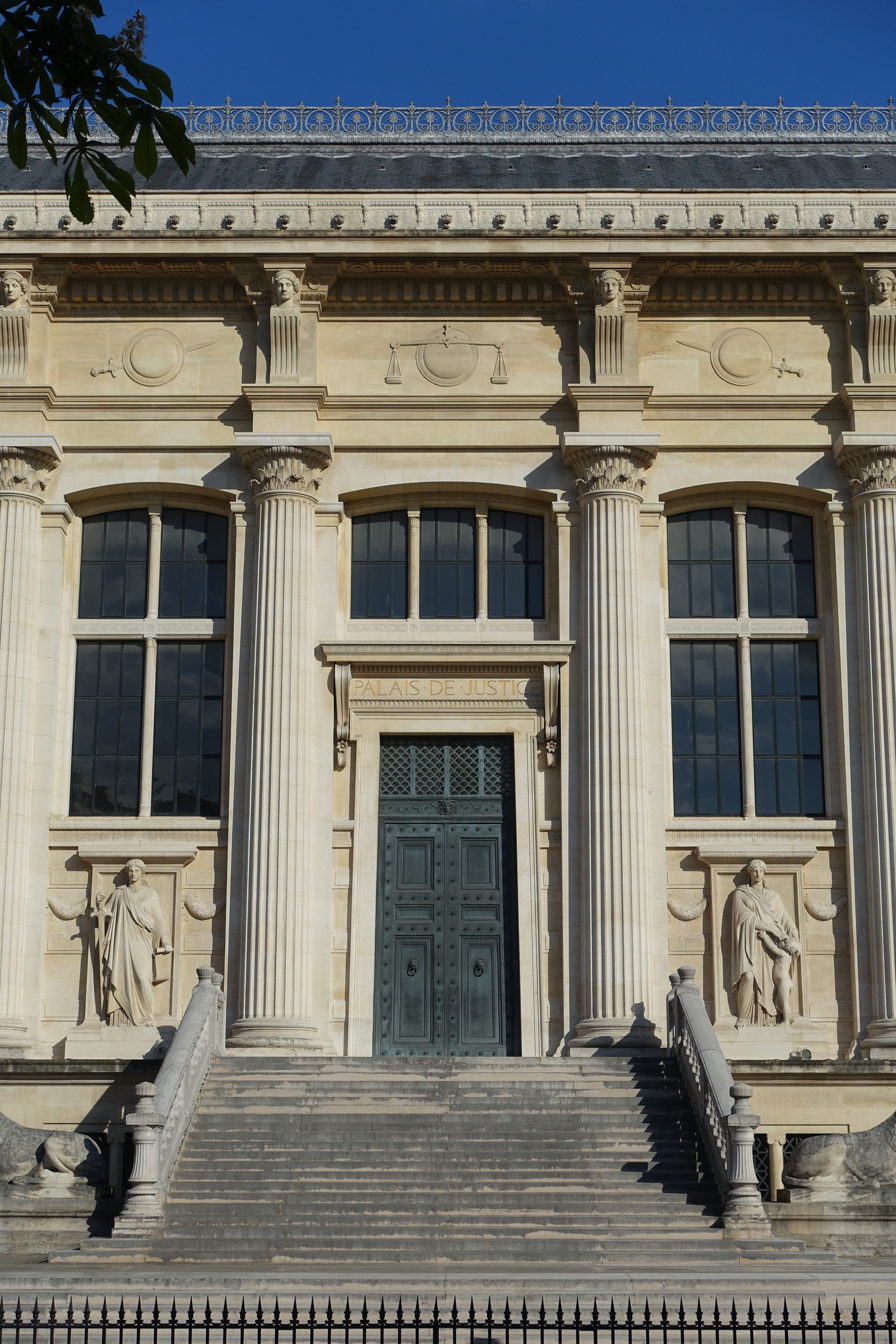
Main door flanked by Punishment (left) and Protection (right)

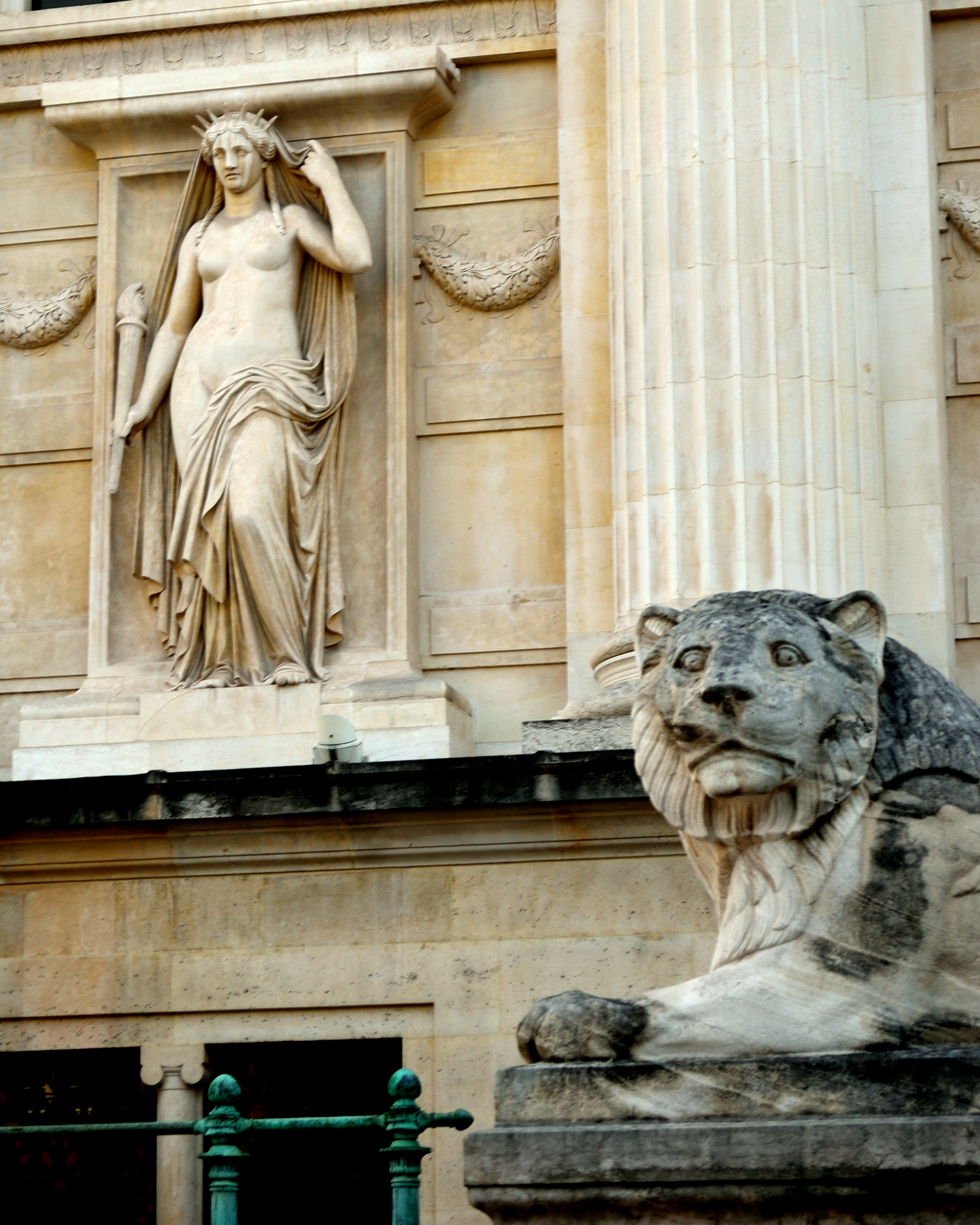
Detail: Truth and lion

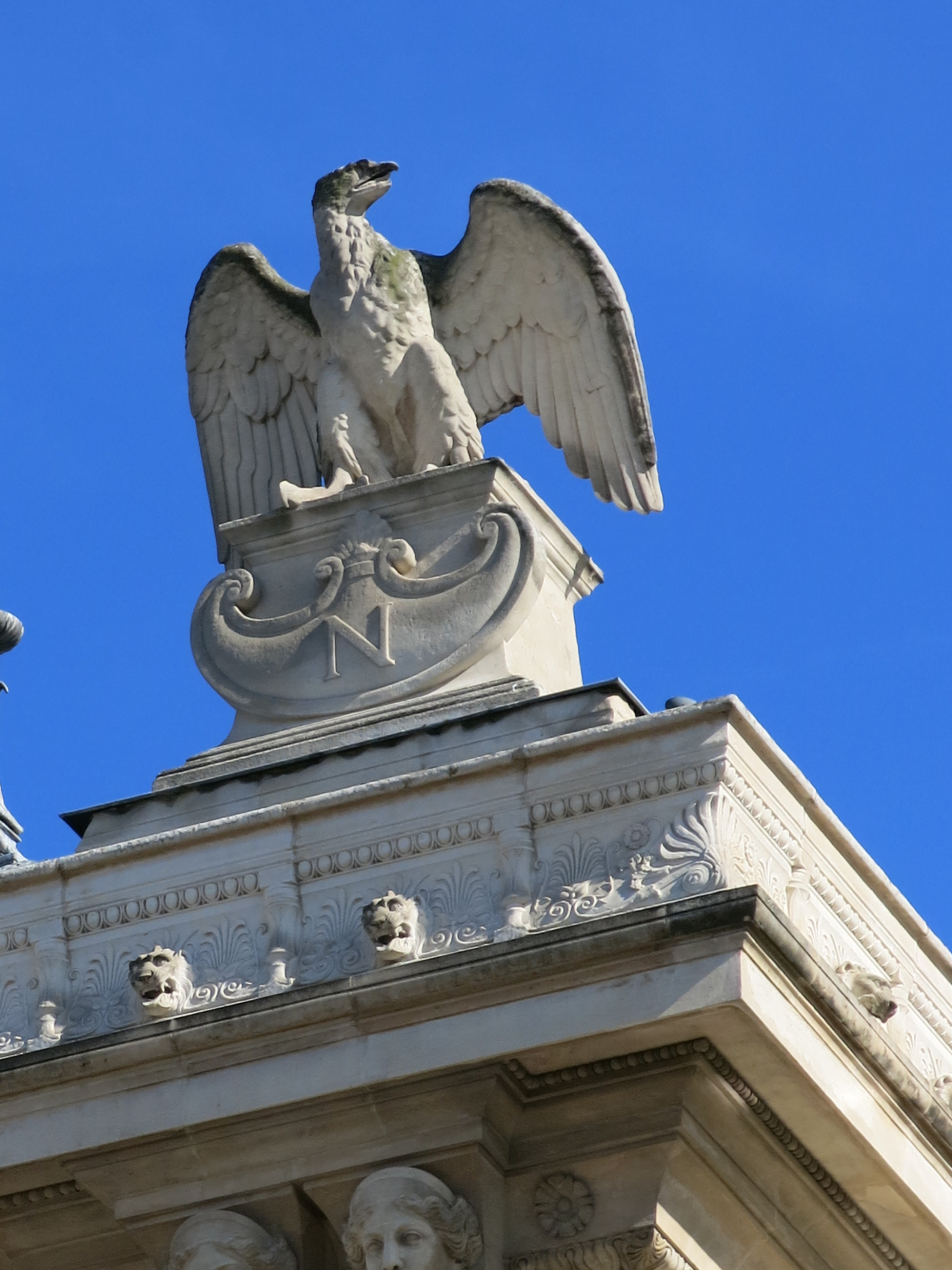
Detail: rooftop Imperial eagle

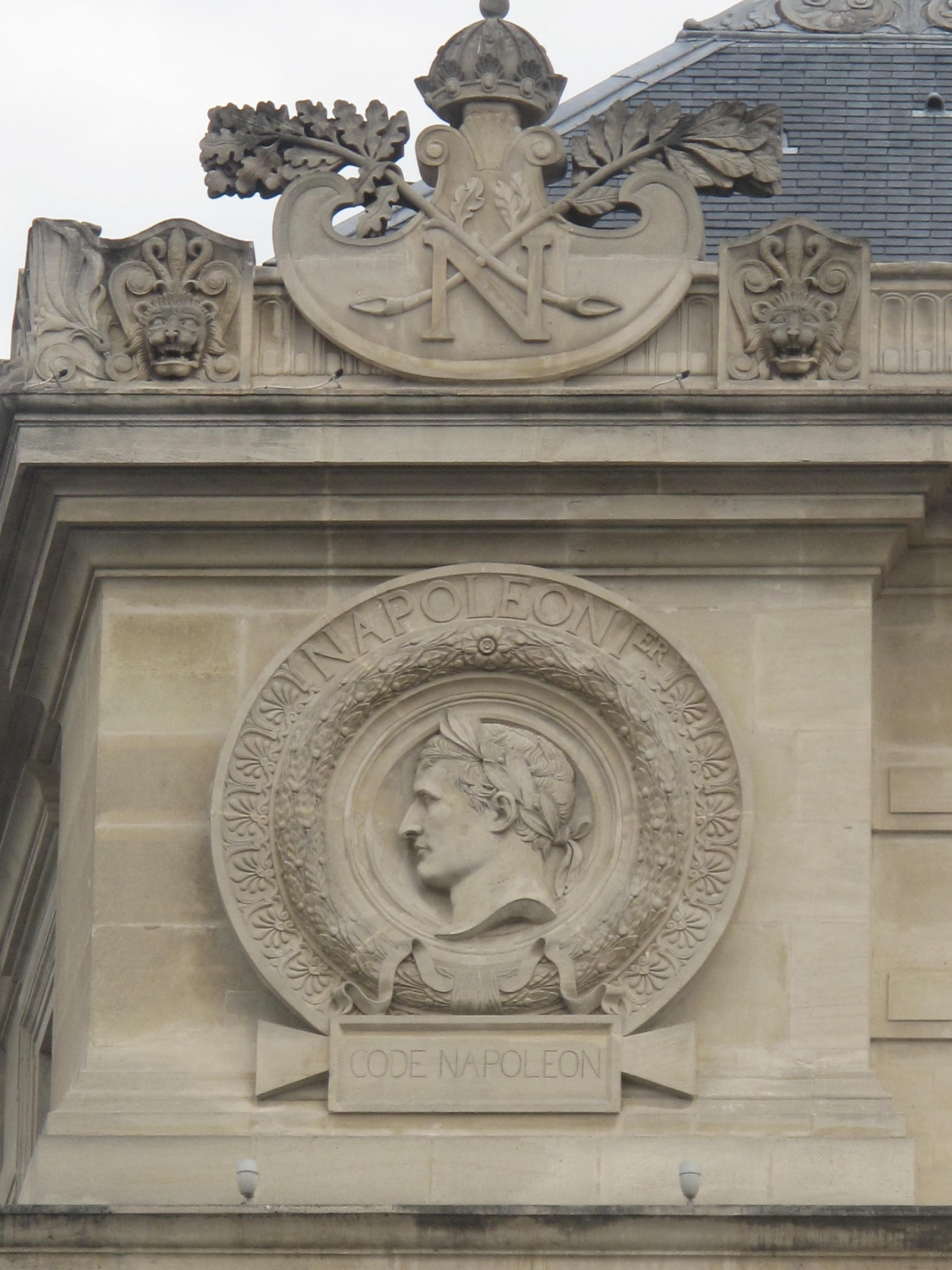
Medallion of Napoleon

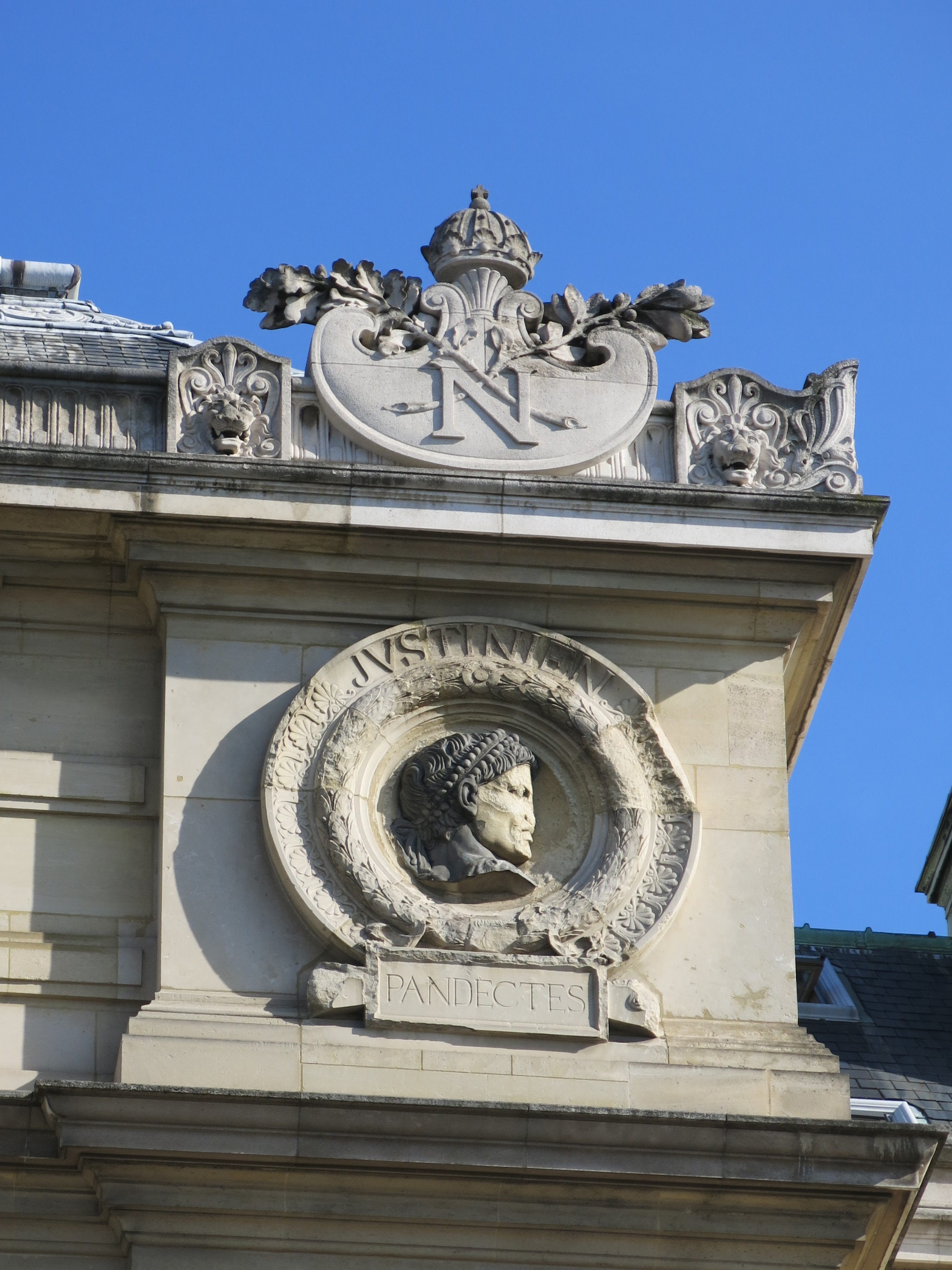
Medallion of Justinian

=== Southern exterior façade ===
The southern façade is made of two distinct wings. The western wing was designed by Émile Gilbert and his son-in-law Arthur-Stanislas Diet, and built between 1875 and 1880 on the location of the Hotel du Bailliage ("Bailiwick Mansion") that had also been burnt down in 1871. The eastern wing is a separate building that was built from 1907 to 1914 as the last major phase of the complex's expansion, replacing demolished private houses on the Quai des Orfevres that were expropriated in 1904. Designed by architect Albert Tournaire, its western end features a picturesque tower under which stands a monumental sundial with the 1913 sculpture Time and Justice by Jean Antoine Injalbert, bearing the Latin inscription HORA FUGIT STAT JUS ("time flies, the law remains"). Further east on the façade are four monumental statues (1914): Truth by Henri-Édouard Lombard, Law by André Allard, Eloquence by Raoul Verlet, and Clemency by Jules Coutan. On the corner with the Boulevard du Palais stands a turret, with the street-level door bearing the monumental inscription GLADIUS LEGIS CUSTOS ("the sword guards the law").

The façade bears impacts from the time of the liberation of Paris in August 1944, from a prolonged stalemate between German forces positioned on the Boulevard du Palais and Resistance fighters on the left bank.

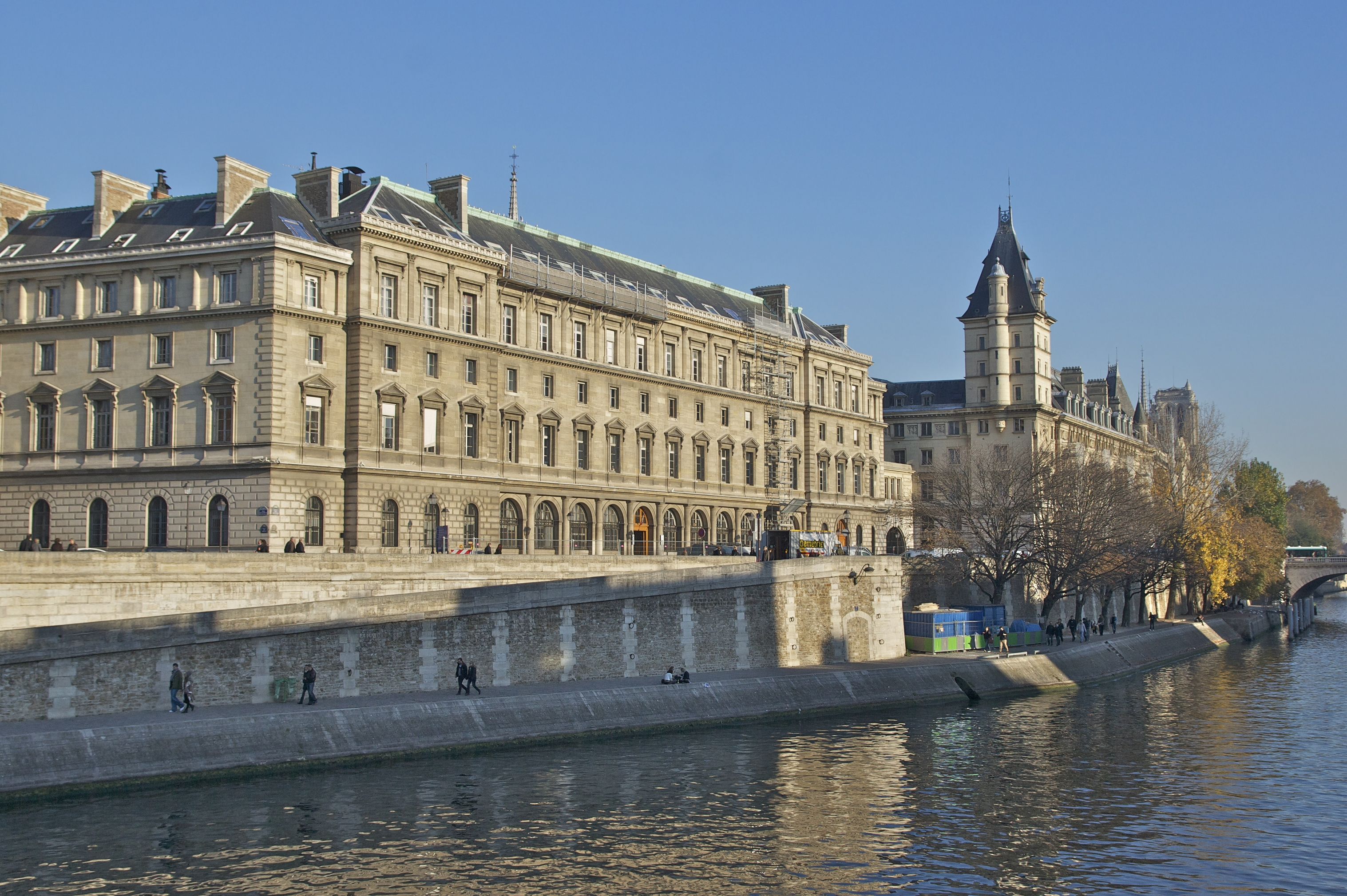
Southern façade, western wing

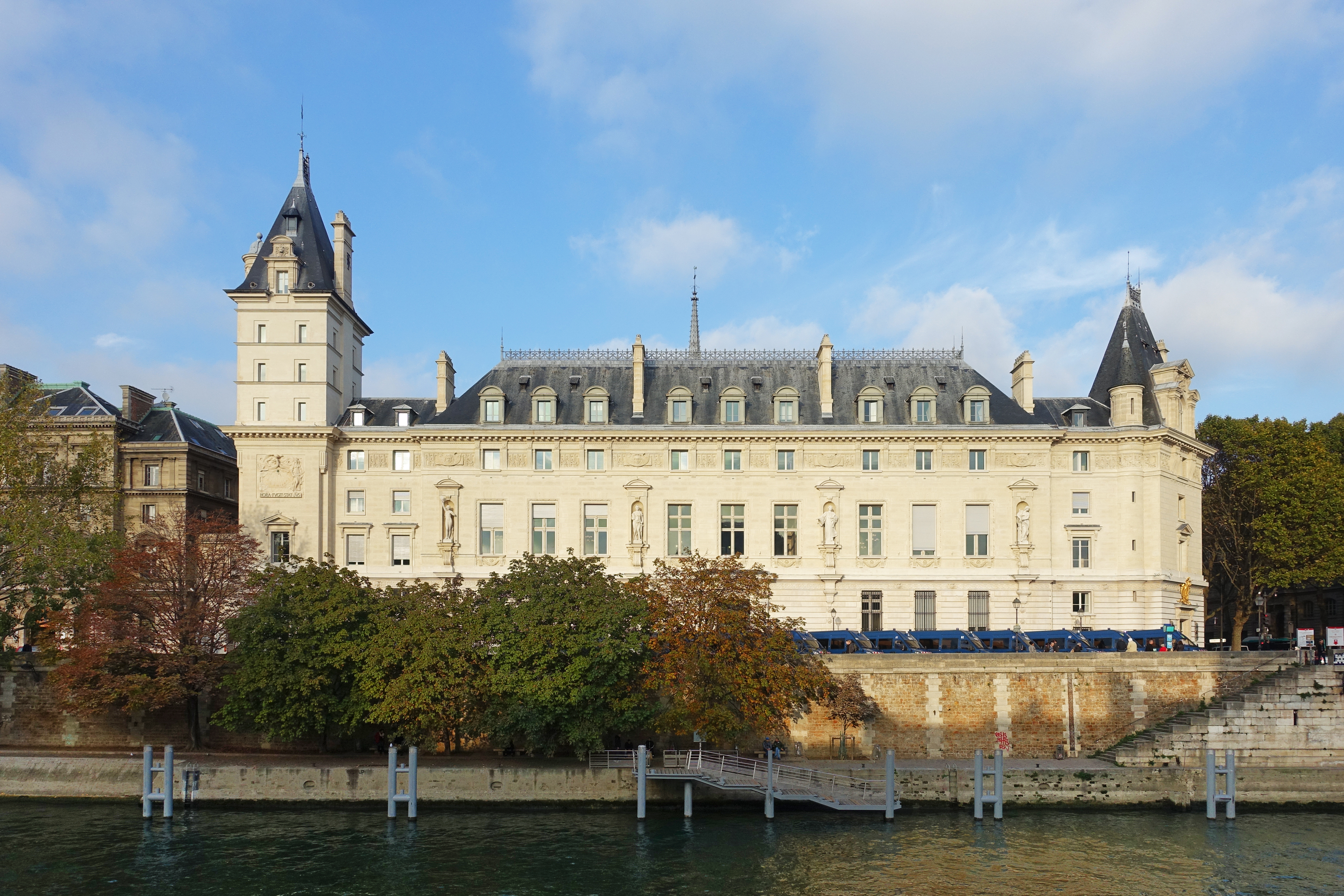
Southern façade, eastern wing

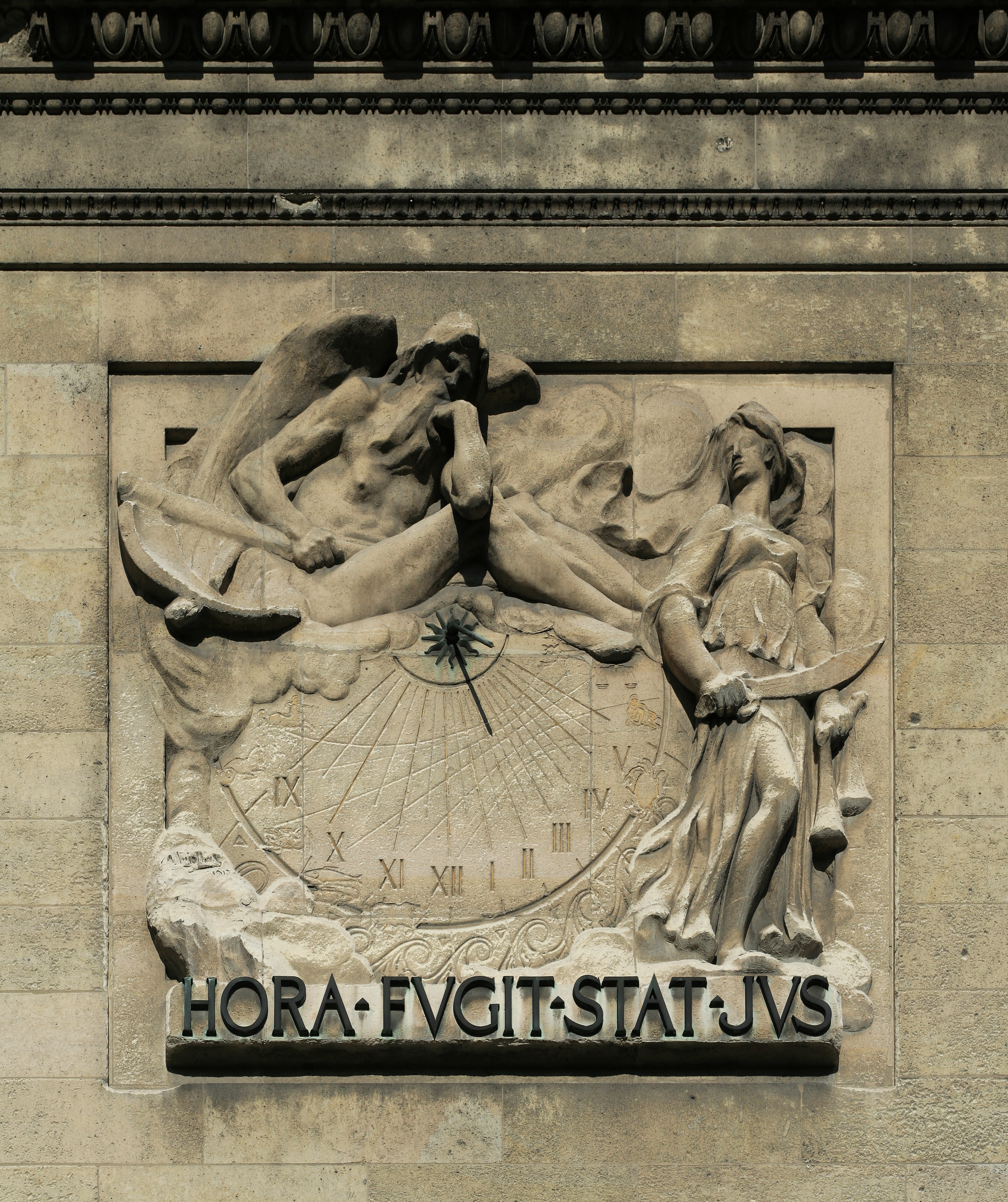
Time and Justice

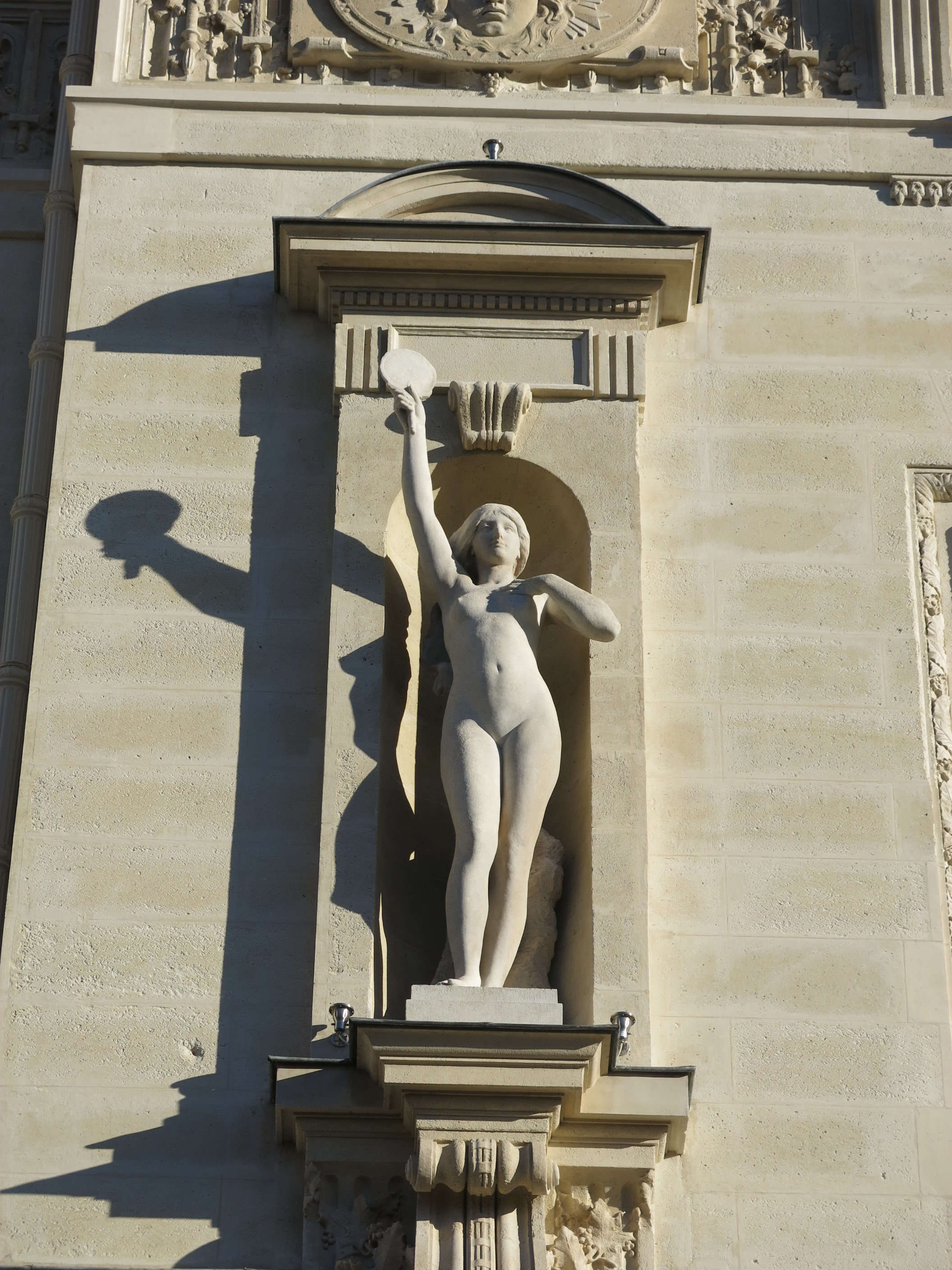
Truth

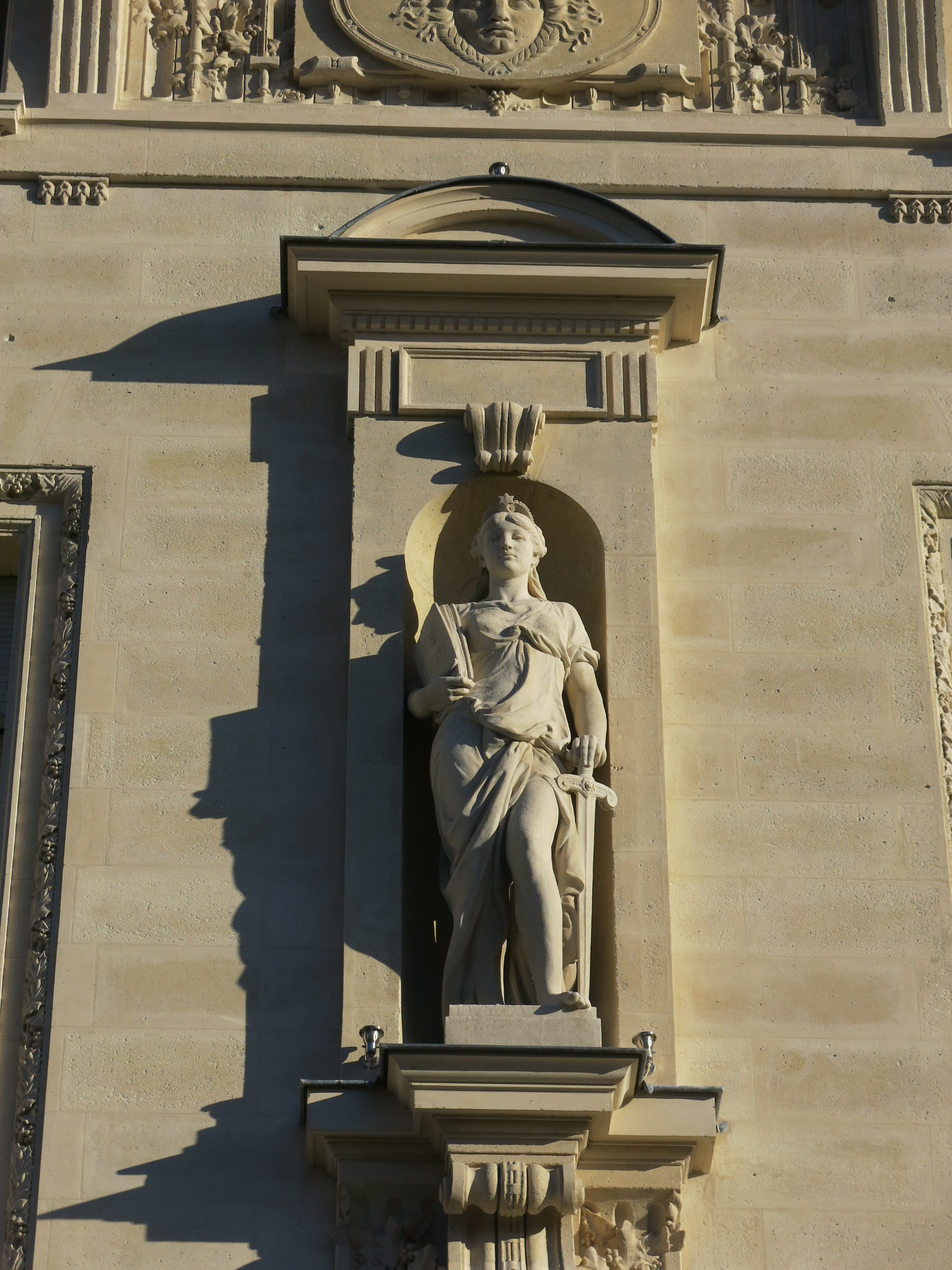
Law

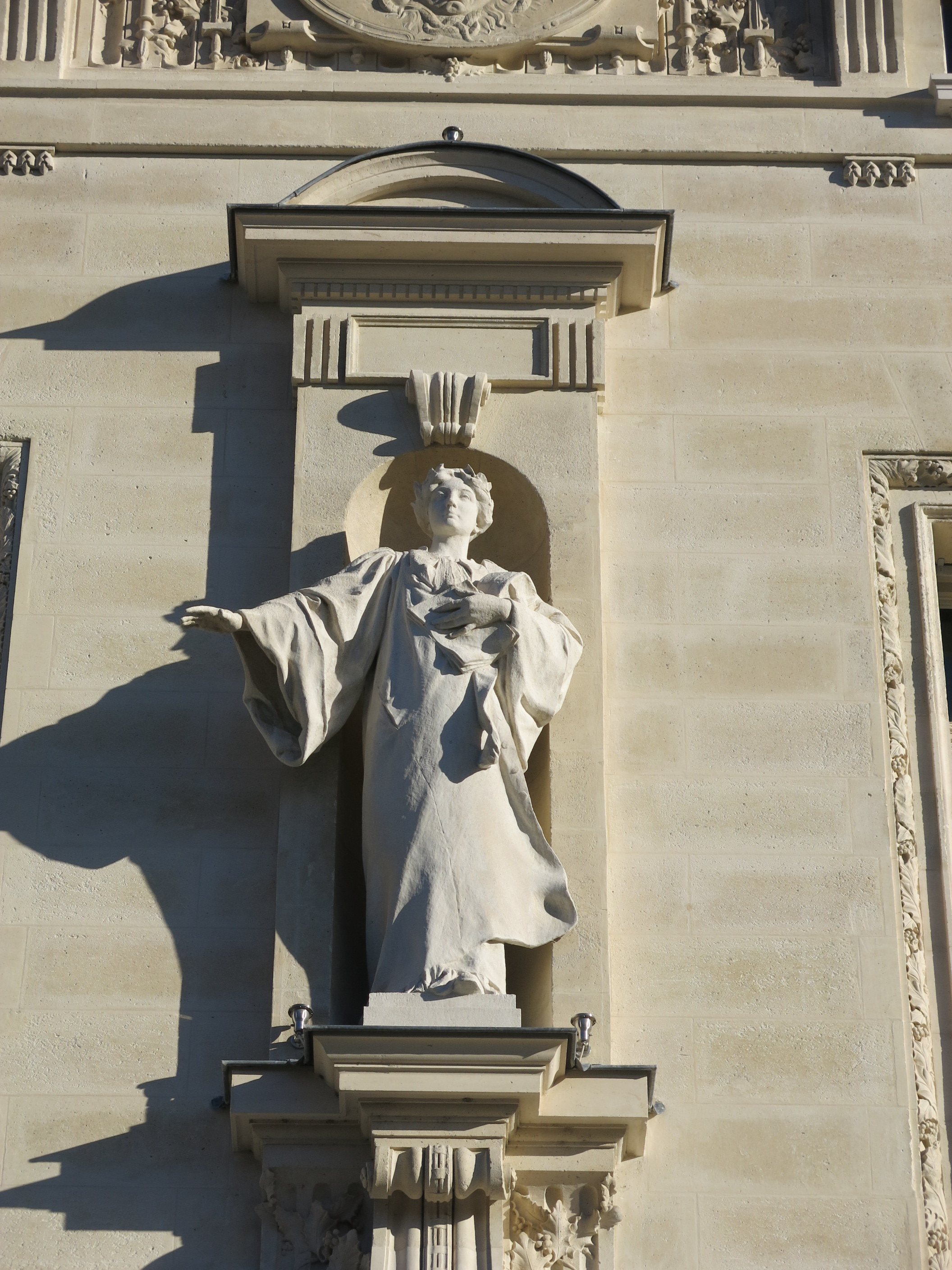
Eloquence

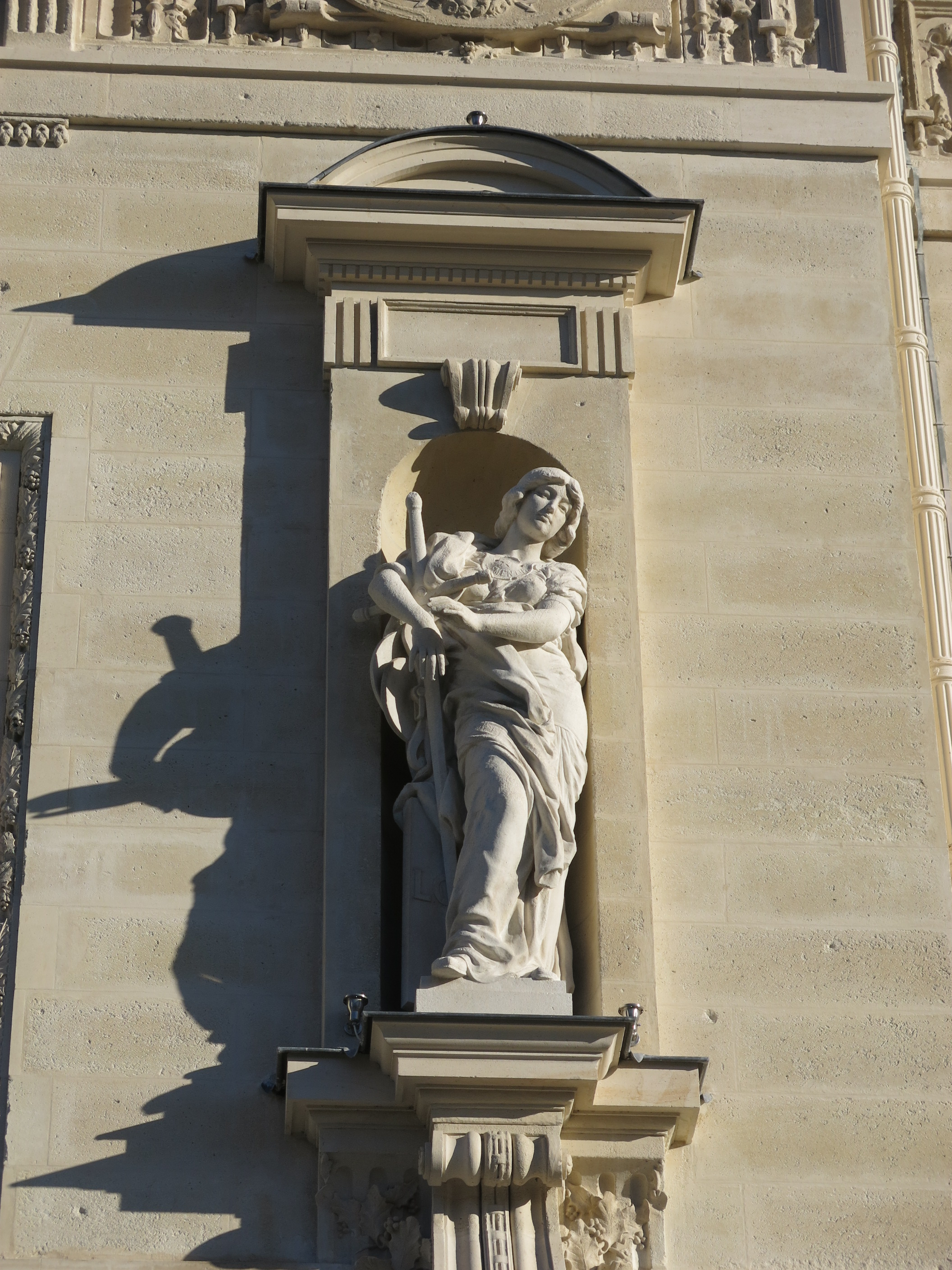
Clemency

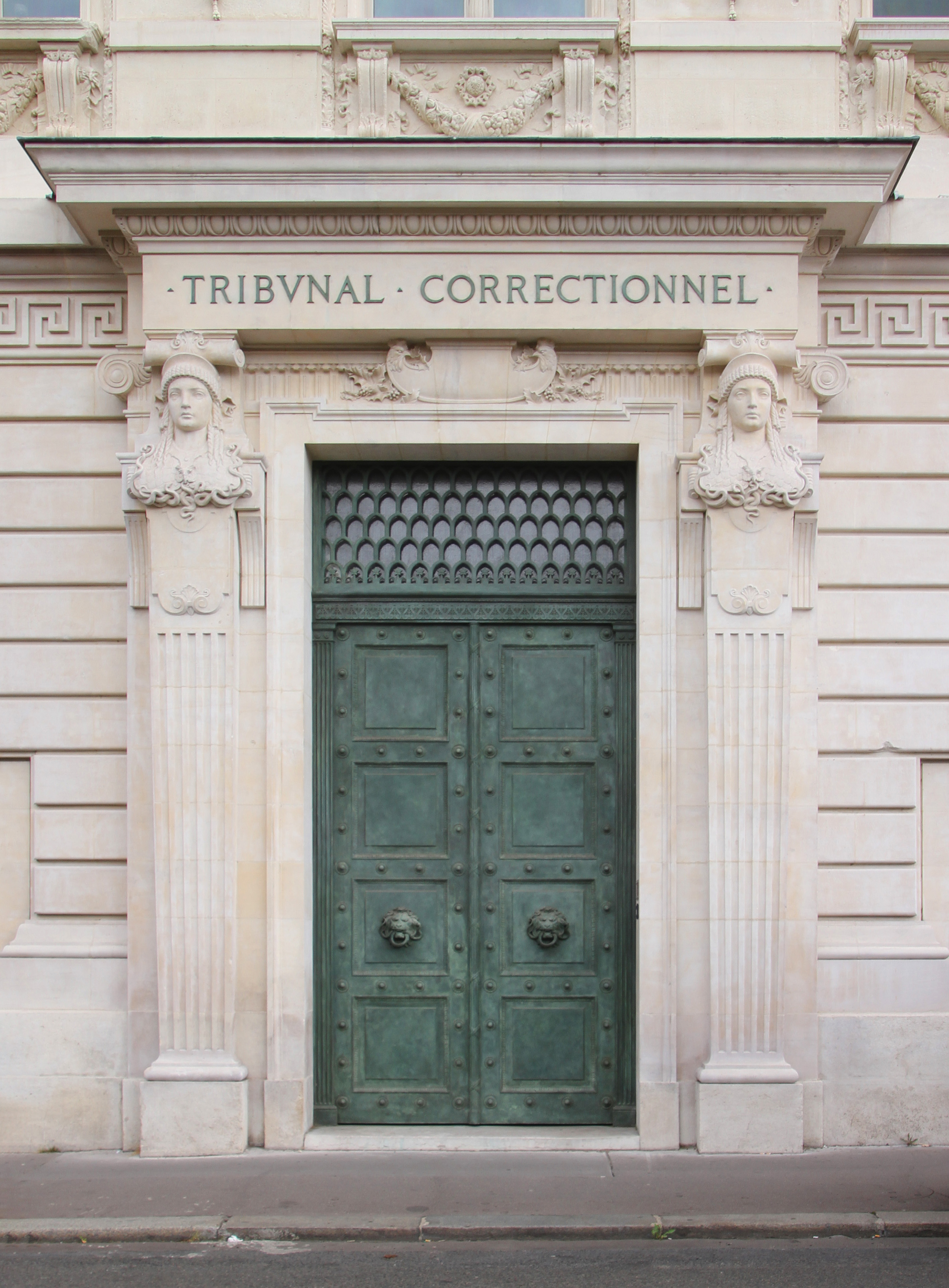
Former criminal court entrance

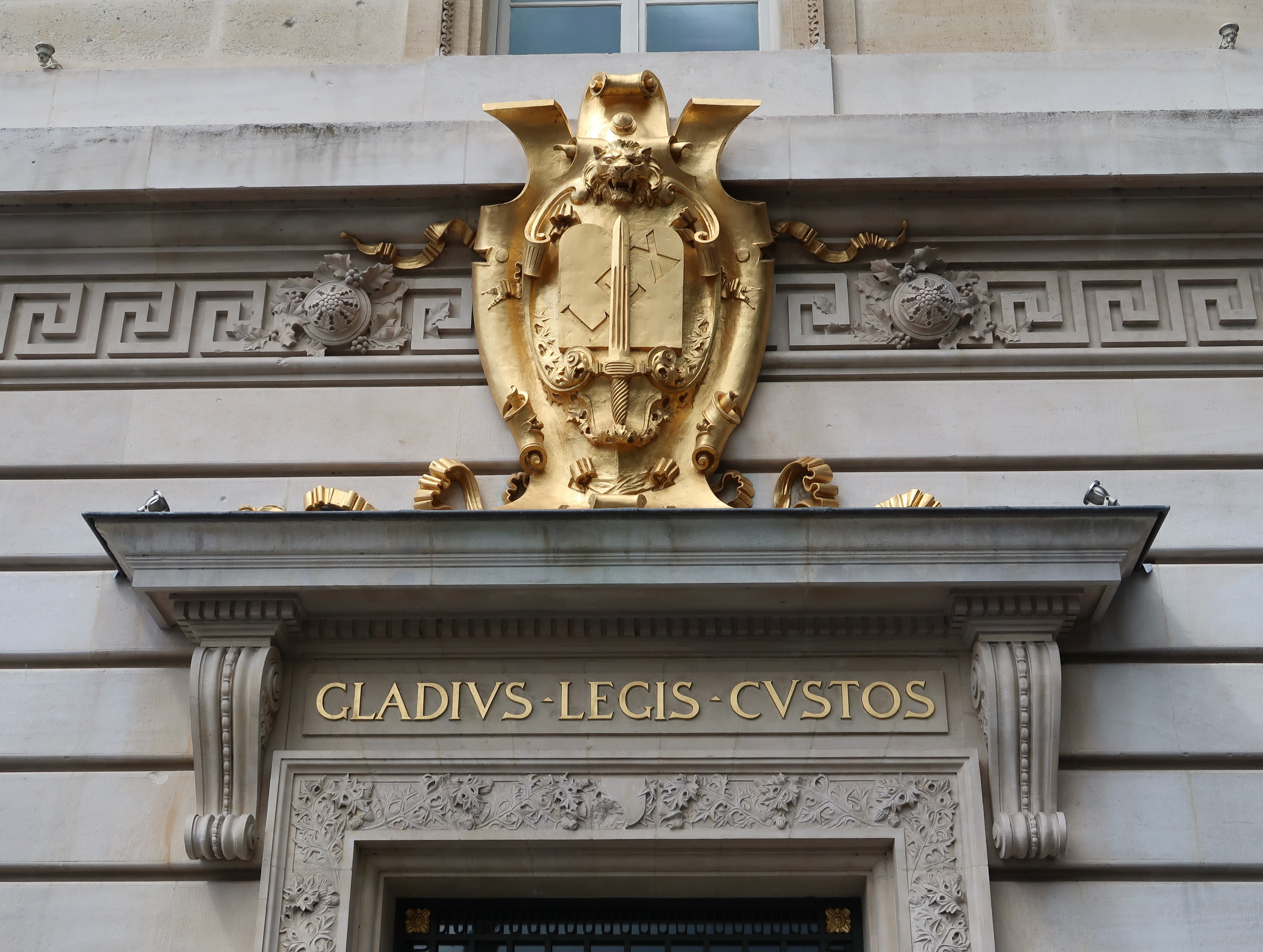
Southeastern turret, entrance door

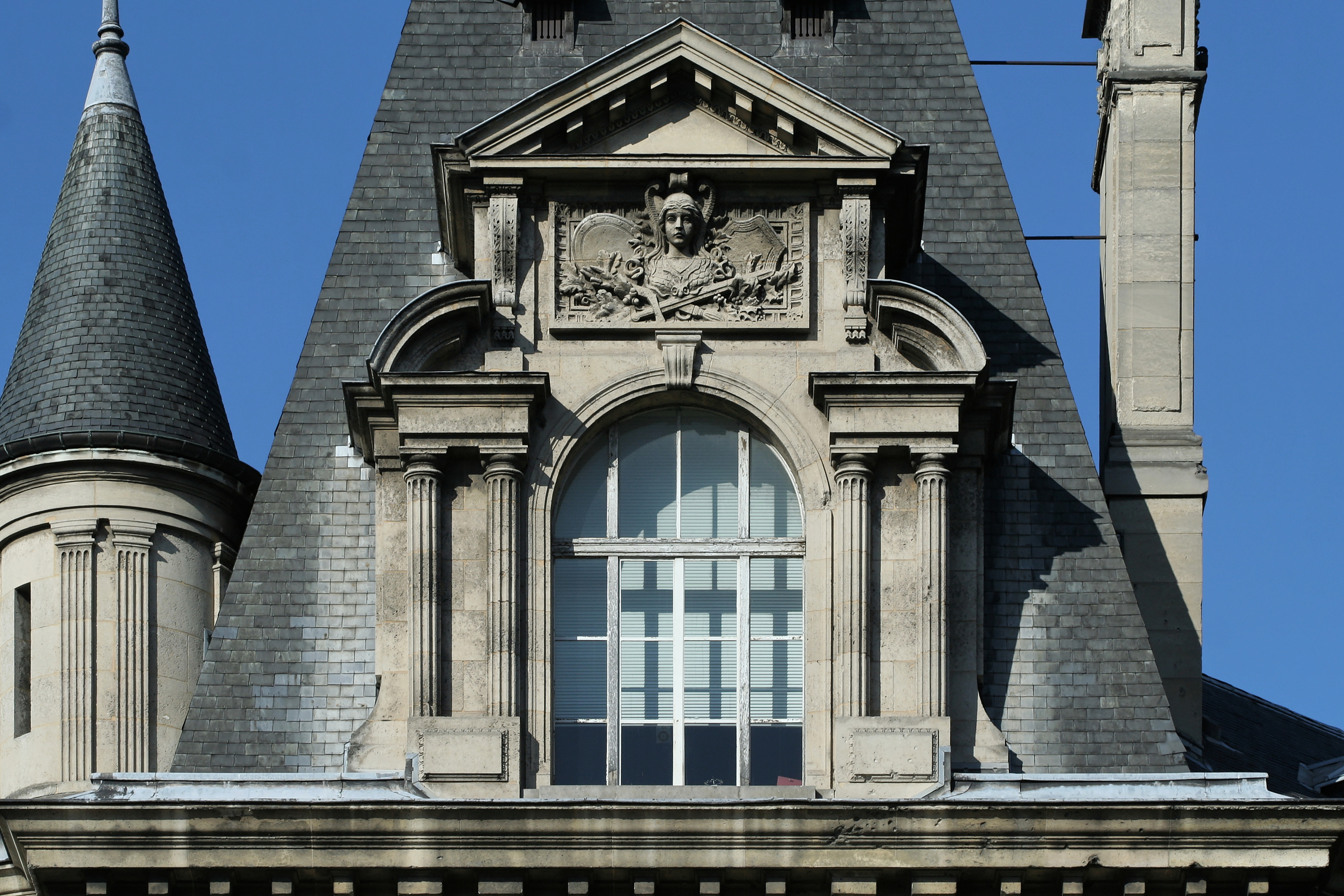
Southeastern turret, rooftop decoration

=== Sainte-Chapelle ===
The Sainte Chapelle was constructed by King Lous IX, later known as Saint Louis, between 1241 and 1248 to keep the holy relics of the Crucifixion of Christ obtained by Louis, including what was believed to be the Crown of Thorns. The lower level of the chapel served as the parish church for the residents of the palace. The upper level was used only by the king and royal family. The stained glass windows of the upper chapel are one of the most important monuments of Medieval art in Paris. The chapel was turned into a storage depot for court documents from the palace of Justice after the Revolution, but was carefully restored during the 19th century.

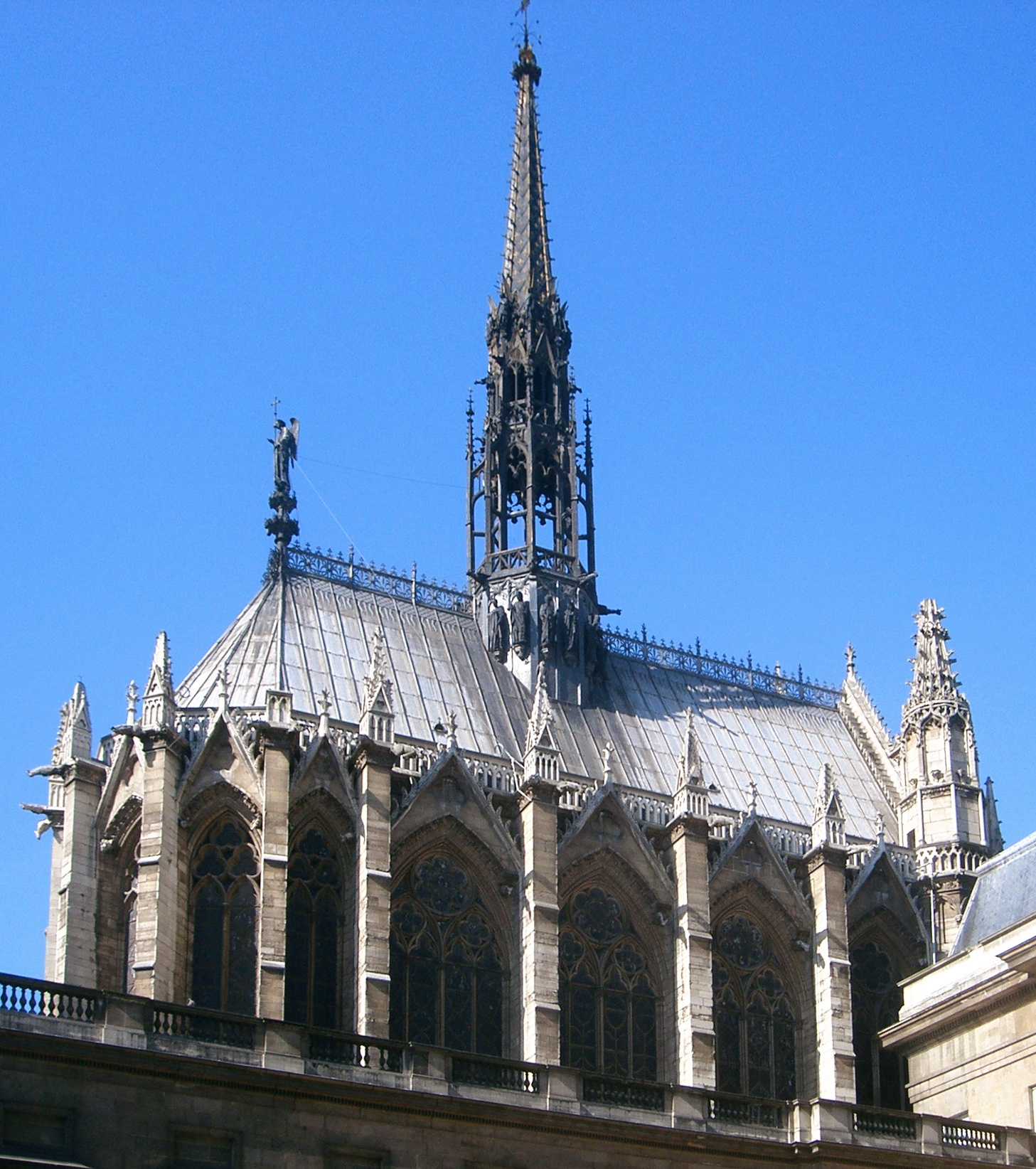
The exterior of the Sainte-Chapelle (1241-1248)

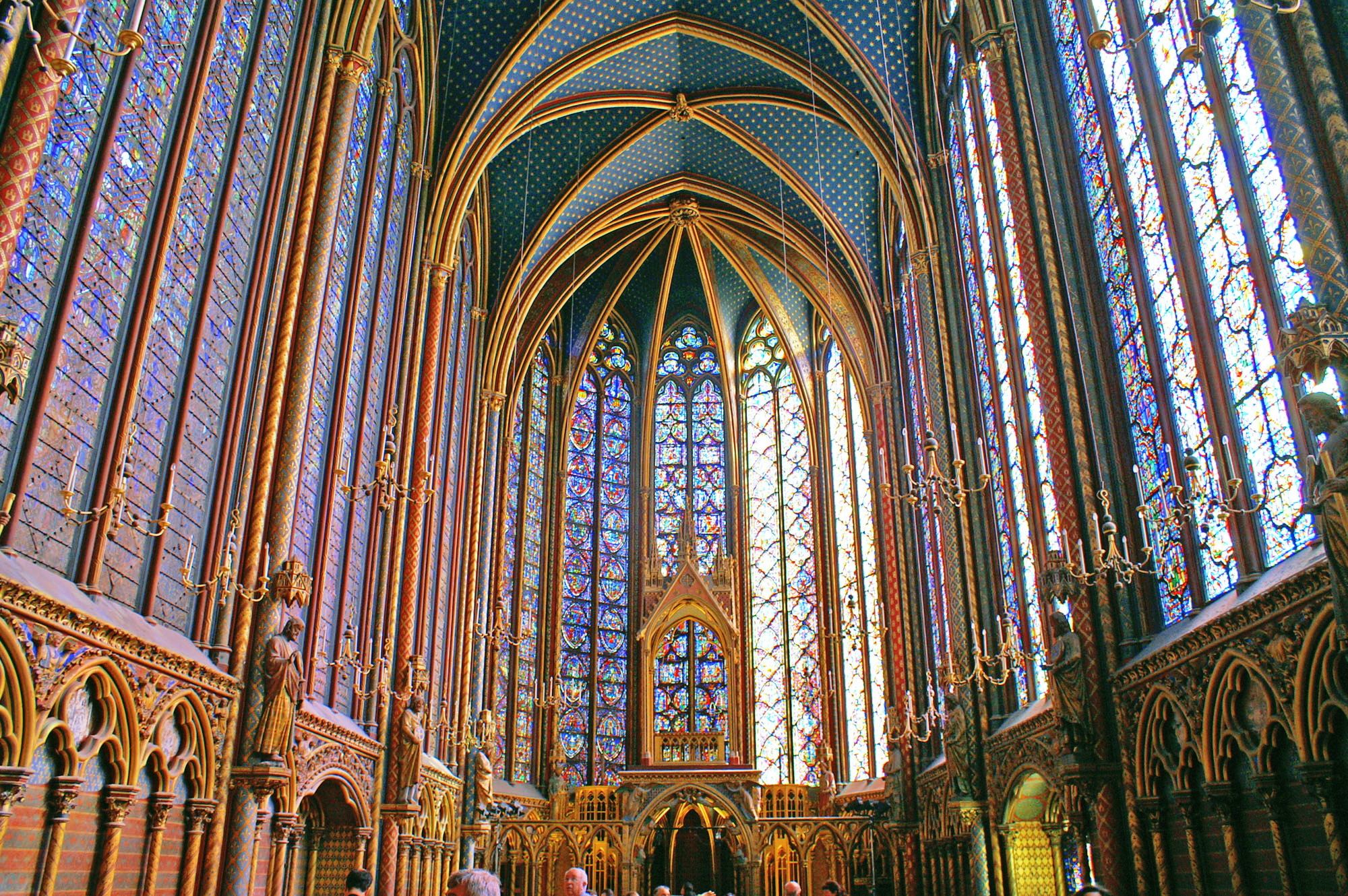
The windows of the upper chapel

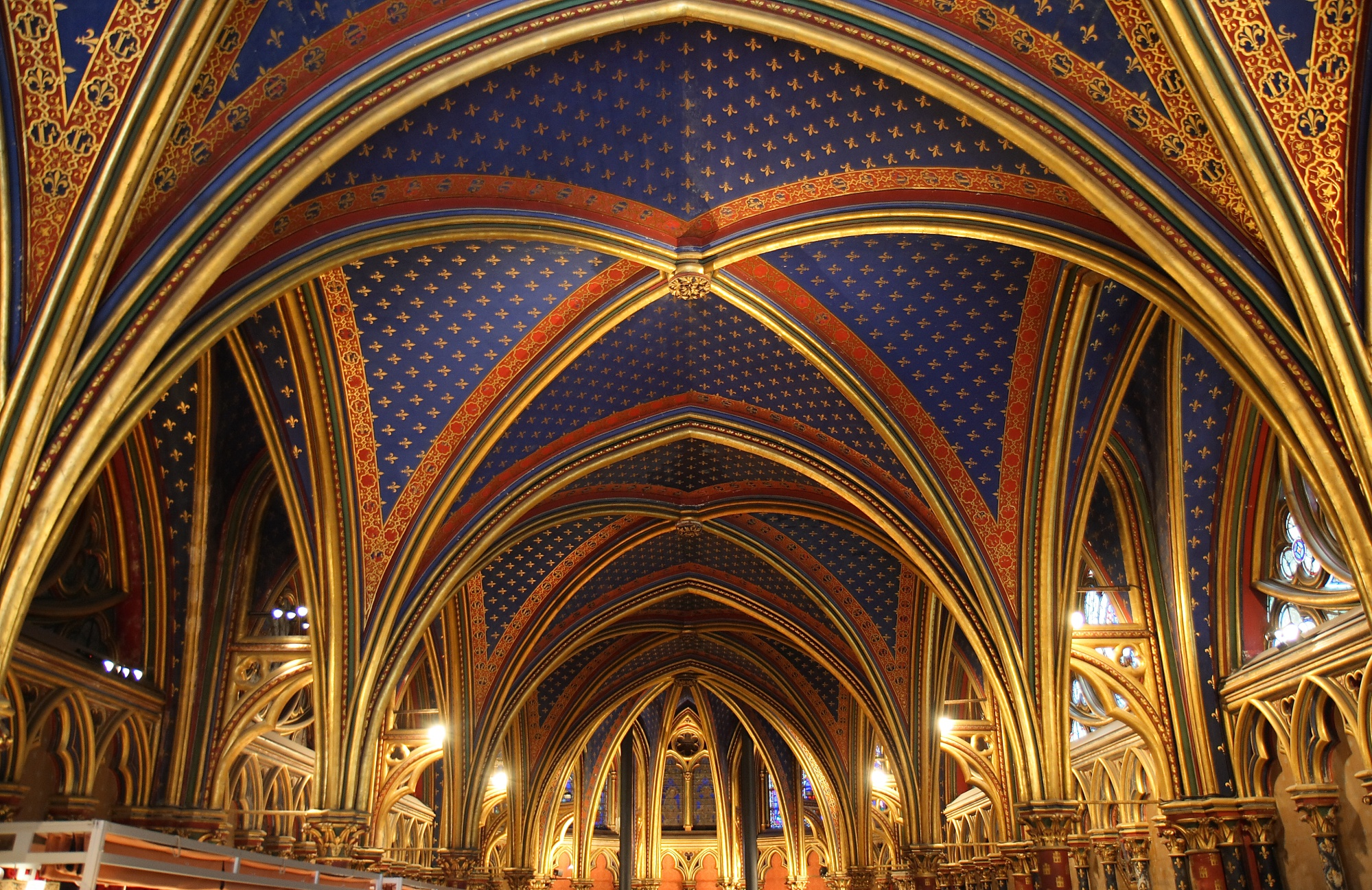
The ceiling of the lower chapel

=== Medieval halls ===
The two halls in the lower part of the Conciergerie, the Salle des Gardes (Hall of the Guards) and the Salle des Gens d'armes (Hall of the Men at Arms), along with the kitchens, are the only surviving rooms of the original Capetian palace. When they were built, the two halls were at street level, but over the centuries, as the island was built up to prevent floods, they were below the street. The Salles des Gardes was built at the end of the 13th and beginning of the 14th century, as the ground floor of the Grand'Chambre, where the king conducted judicial hearings, and where, during the Revolution, the Revolutionary Tribunal met. It was connected with the hall above by a stairway in the southwest part of the hall, and by a second stairway in a tower which was demolished in the 19th century. It is one of the finest examples of medieval architecture in Paris. The hall is 22.8 meters long, 11.8 meters wide, and 6.9 meters high. The massive columns have decorative sculpture of combat of animals and narrative scenes. Two stairways on the north side of the hall lead up to the towers of Argent and Cesar where prison cells were located. During the Revolution, the apartment of the chief prosecutor of the Terror, Fouquier-Tinville, was on the upper floor, and his office was in the Tower of Cesar. The Salle des Gardes was filled with prison cells until the mid-19th century, when the hall was restored to its original appearance.

The Salle des Gens d'armes was the ground floor below the magnificent Grand'Salle, where the kings of France held banquets to welcome royal guests, and to celebrate special events, such as the visit of Charles IV, Holy Roman Emperor in 1378, hosted by Charles V shortly before he moved out of the palace, and the marriage of Francis II with Mary, Queen of Scots. The hall itself, with a high double-vaulted wooden roof, burned several times, most recently in fires started by the Paris Commune in May 1871. It was replaced by a new grand hall, the Salle des Pas Perdu, of the Palace of Justice. During the Middle Ages the lower floor was used largely as a restaurant and holding area for the large staff of the Royal household; it could serve as many as two thousand persons. A large stairway, now walled off, connected the lower floor with the Grand'Salle. The Salle is 63.3 meters long, 27.4 meters wide, and 8.5 meters high. Beginning in the 15th century the hall was divided into smaller rooms and prison cells.

The hall underwent many changes and restorations over the centuries. After a fire destroyed most of the upper hall in 1618, the architect Salomon de Brosse built a new hall, but made the error of not placing the new columns over the original columns in the lower level. This led in the 19th century to the collapse of part of the roof of the lower hall, which was rebuilt with additional columns. In the 19th century windows were also added on the north side looking out at the courtyard. The circular stairway in the northeast corner of the Salle, built in the medieval style, was constructed in the 19th century during the reign of Napoleon III, who had briefly been held a prisoner himself in the building.

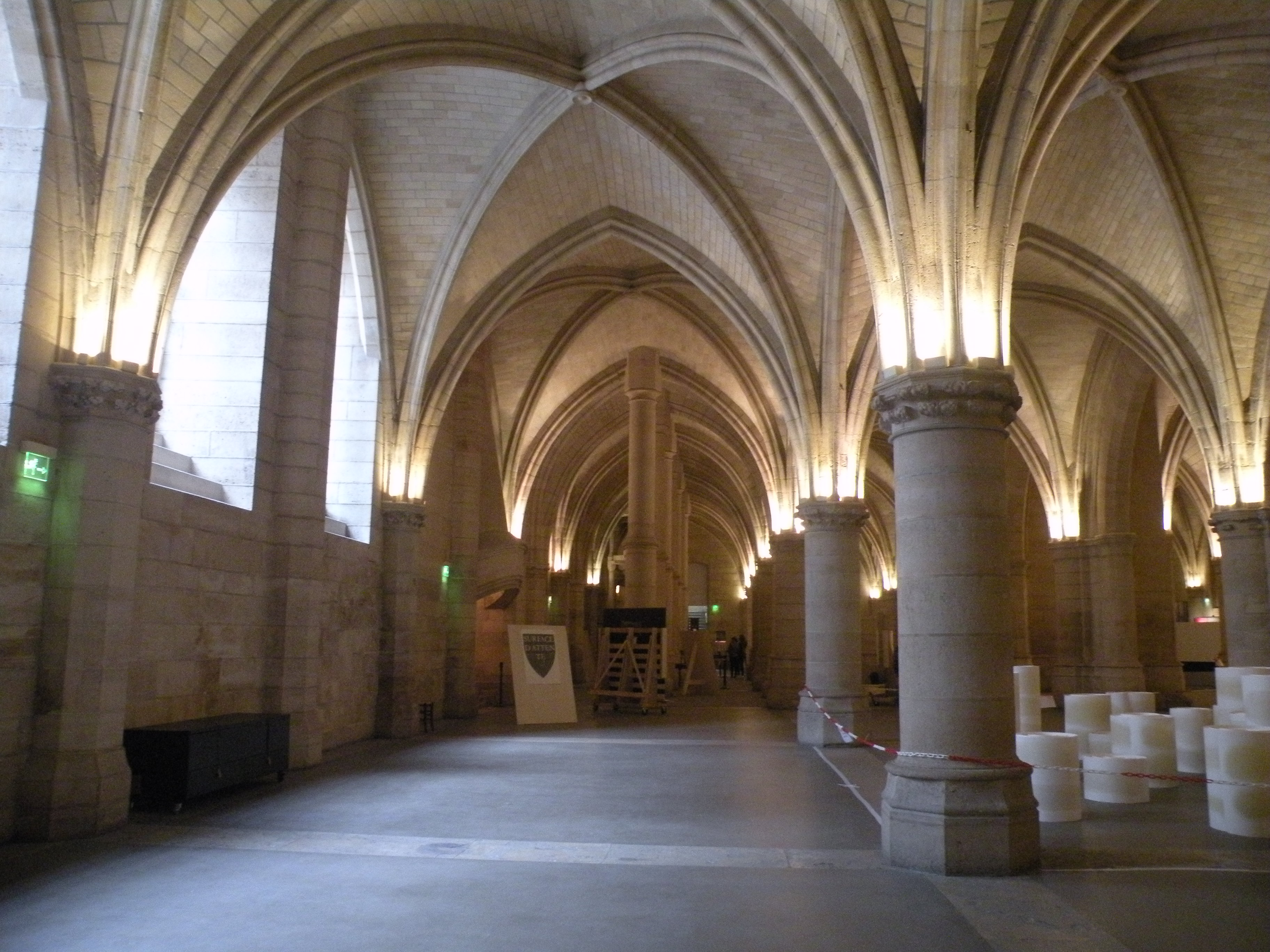
The Salle des gens d'armes, below the now vanished medieval Grand'Salle

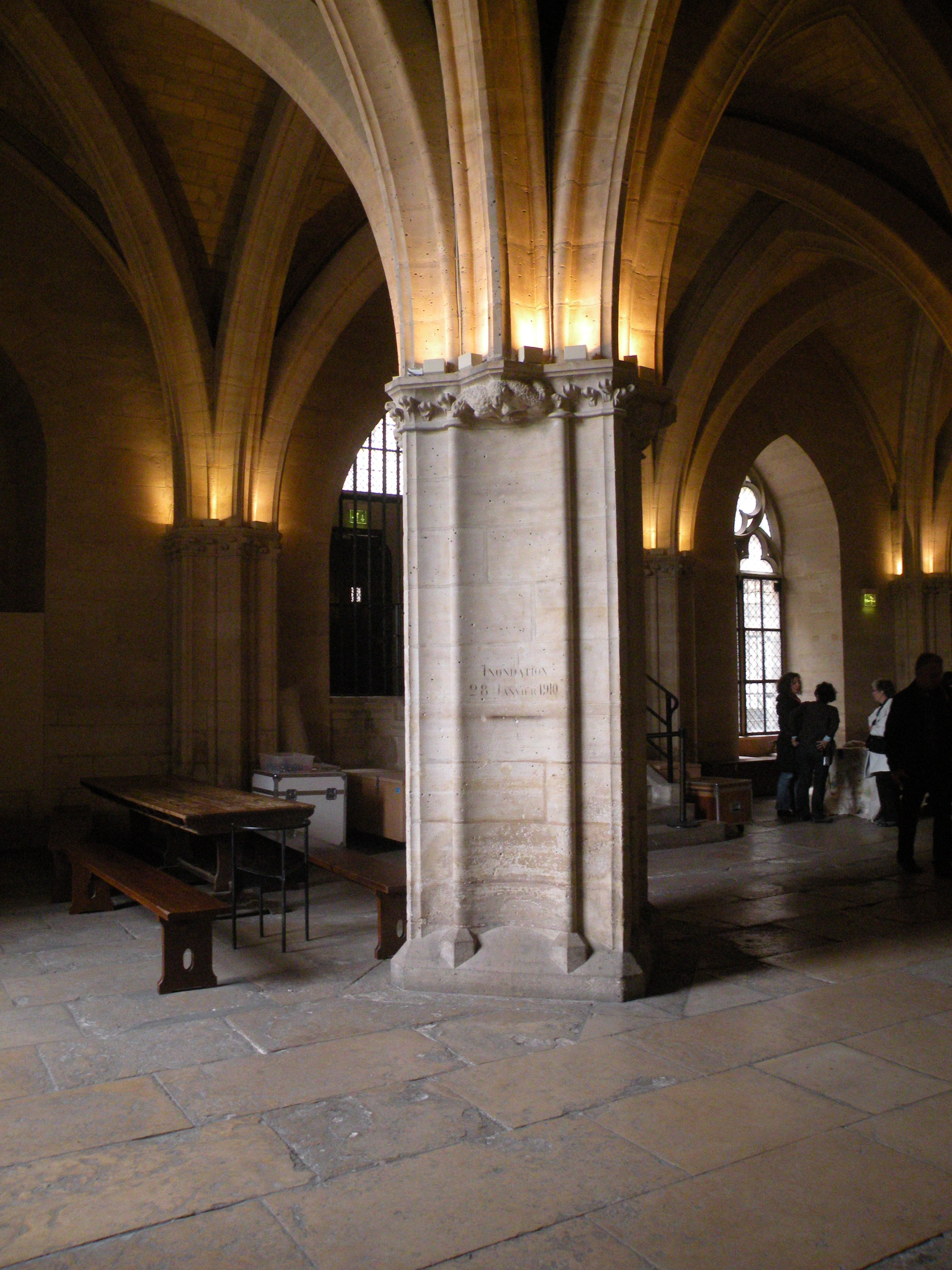
The Salle des gardes, beneath the former Grand'Chambre

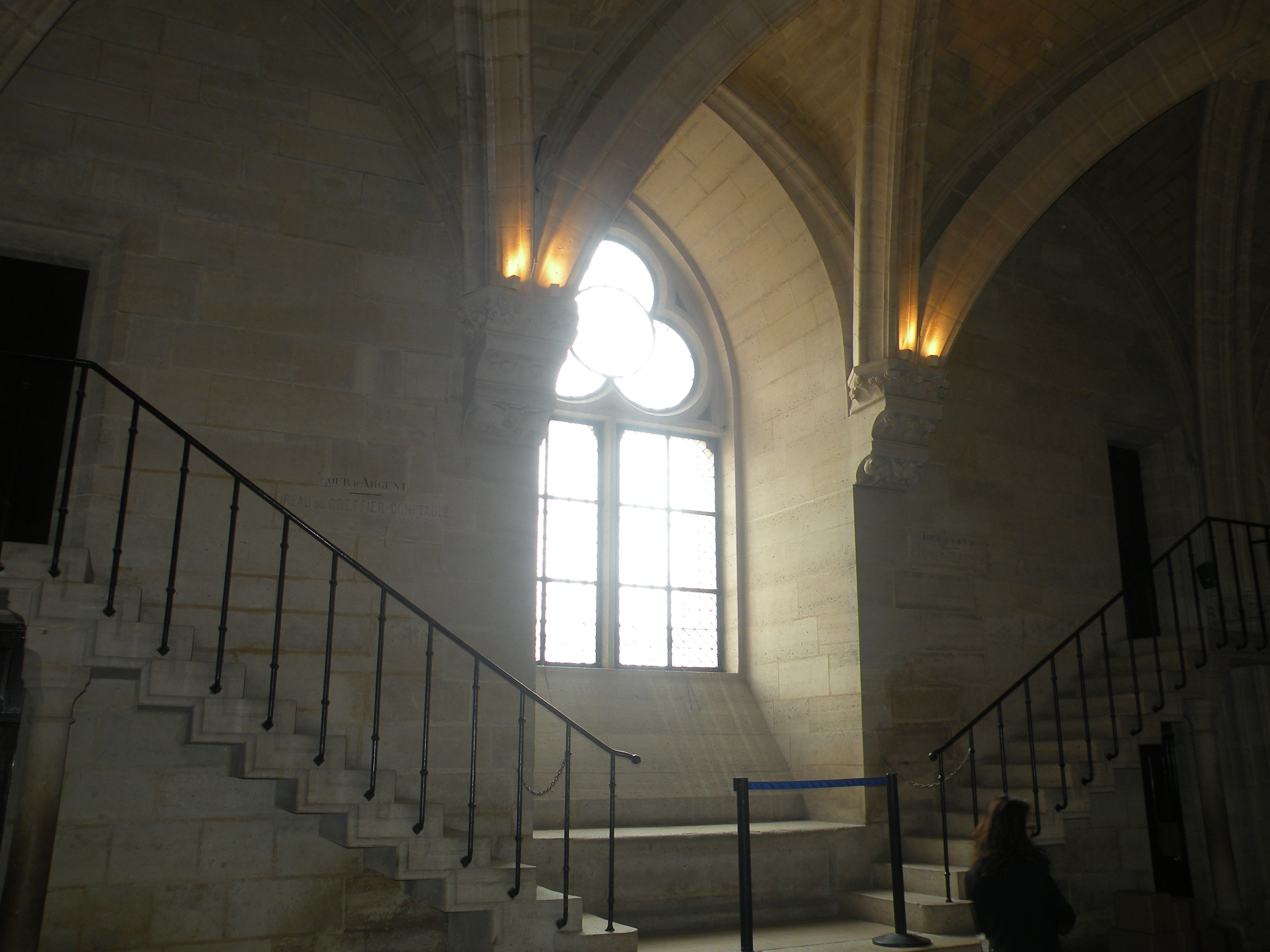
Stairways in the Salle des gardes to the Argent and Cesar towers

=== Conciergerie prison ===
The prison quarter of the Palace visible today dates to the late 18th century. After a fire in 1776, Lous XVI had a section of Conciergerie prison rebuilt; During the French Revolution it served as the principal prison for political prisoners, including Marie Antoinette, before their trials and execution. The prison was extensively rebuilt in the 19th century, and many famous rooms, such as the original cell of Marie Antoinette, disappeared. However, part of the prison was restored for the 200th anniversary of the French Revolution in 1989 and can be seen by visitors.

The Rue de Paris was a section of the Salle des gardes which was separated by a grill from the rest of the hall during the 15th century. During the Revolution it was used as a common cell for prisoners when all the other cells were full. It took its name from "Monsieur Paris", the nickname for the executioner.

The Chapel of the Girondins is one chamber that has changed little since the Revolution. It was constructed after the 1776 fire on the site of medieval oratory of the Palace. In 1793 and 1794, when the prison was overcrowded, it was converted to prison cells. It took its name from the Girondins, a Revolutionary faction of deputies who opposed the more radical Montagnards of Robespierre. The Deputies were arrested and held a last "banquet" in the chapel the night before their execution.

The Cour des Femmes was the courtyard where women prisoners, including Marie Antoinette, were allowed to walk, to wash their clothing in the fountain, or to eat at an outdoor table. The courtyard is little changed from the time of the Revolution.

The cell where Marie Antoinette passed two and half months before her trial and execution was turned into an expiatory chapel by King Louis XVIII after the restoration of the monarchy. The chapel occupies both the space of her original cell and the infirmary of the prison, where Robespierre was held after his suicide attempt and before his trial and execution.

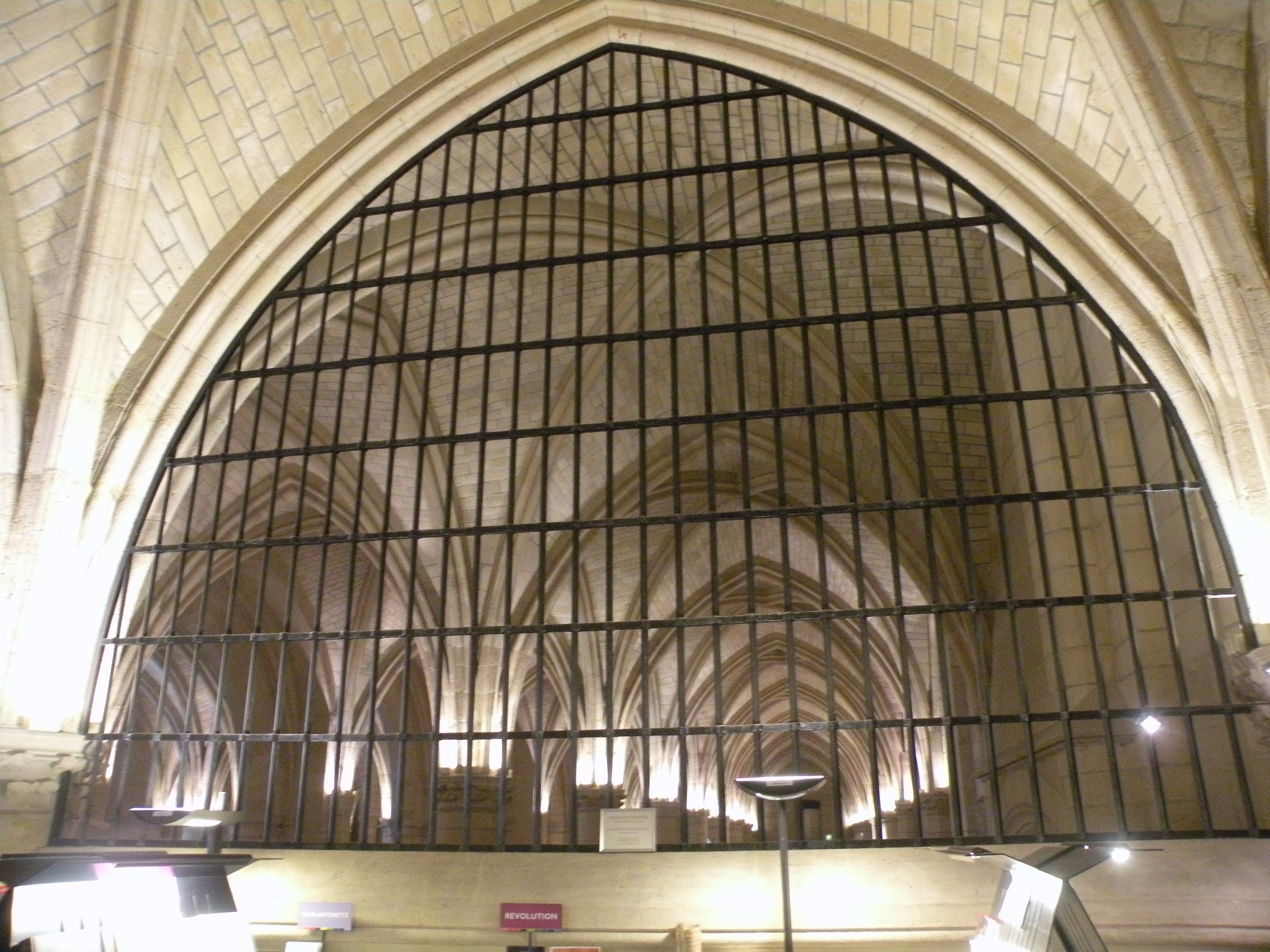
The Rue de Paris

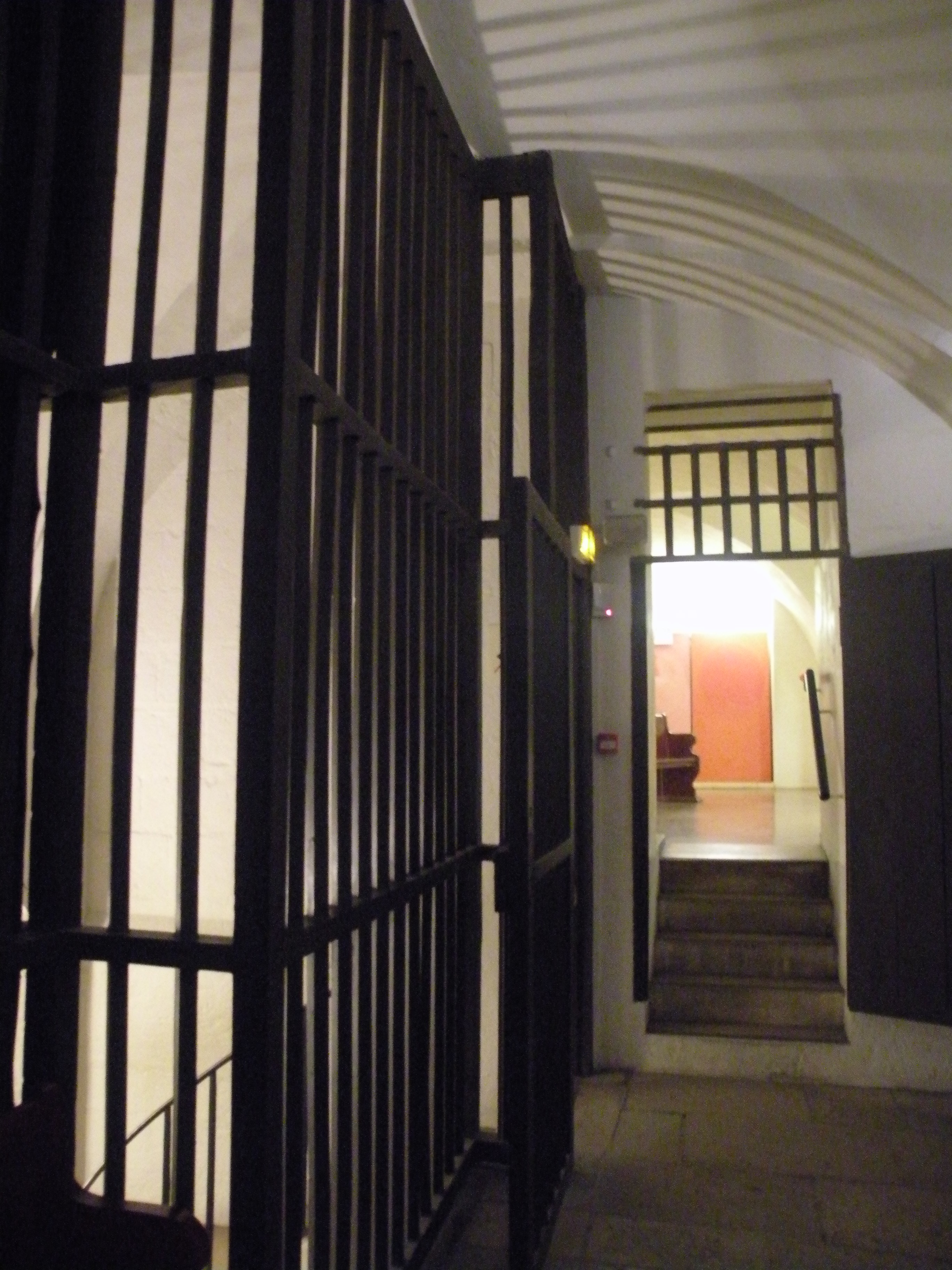
Prison cells

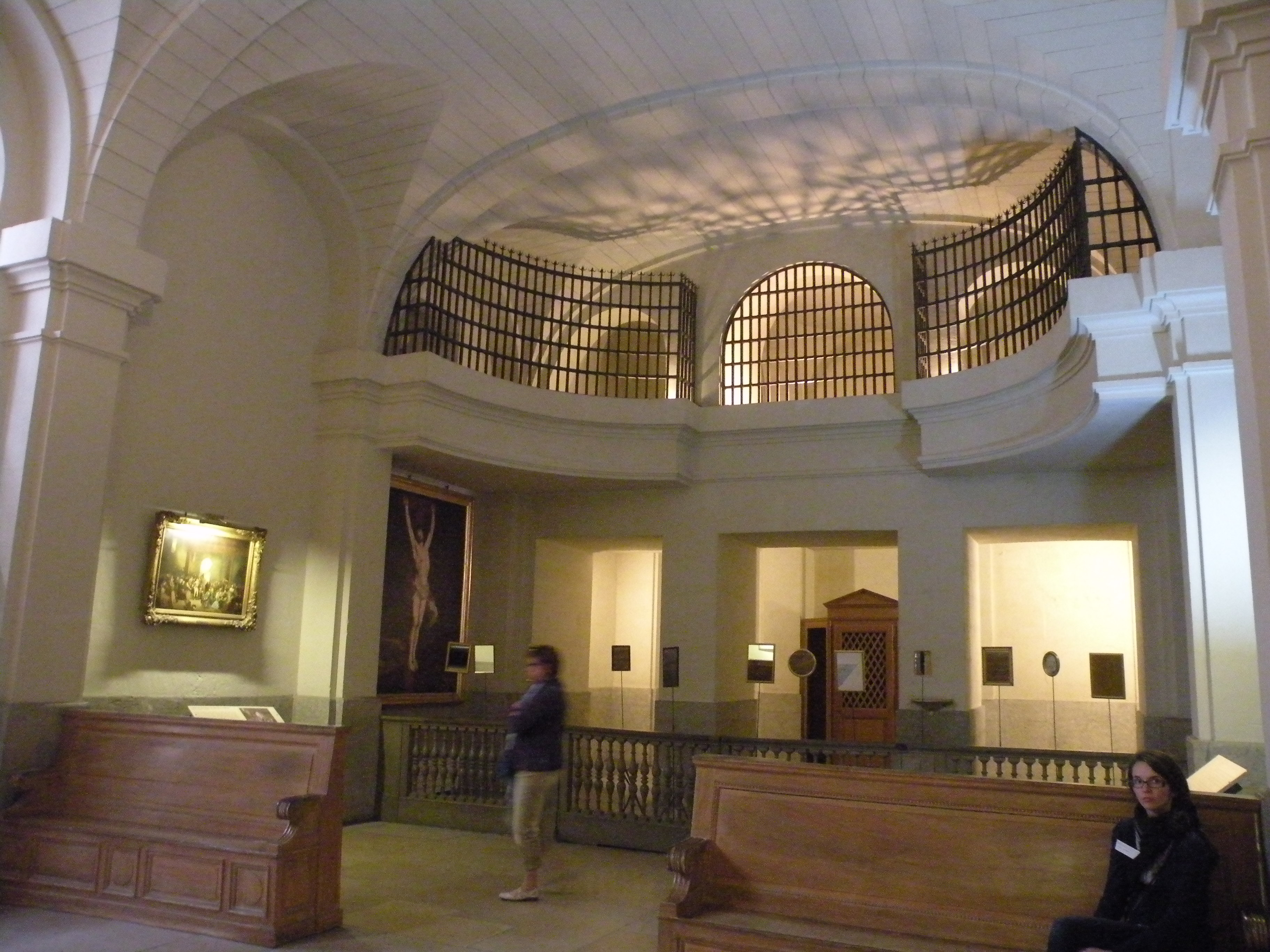
The Chapel of the Girondins, converted to prison cells

=== Interiors ===
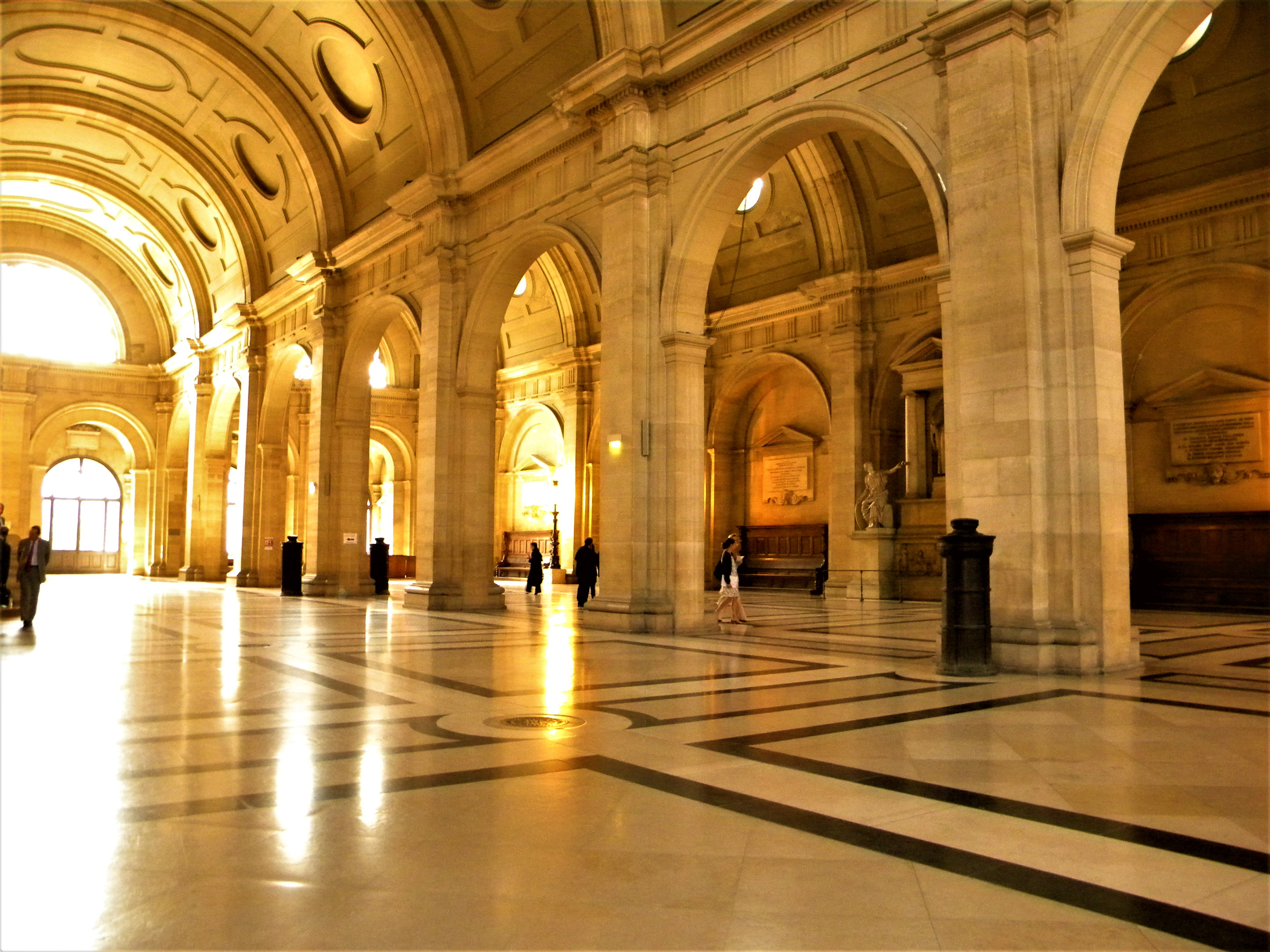
Hall of the "Pas Perdus"

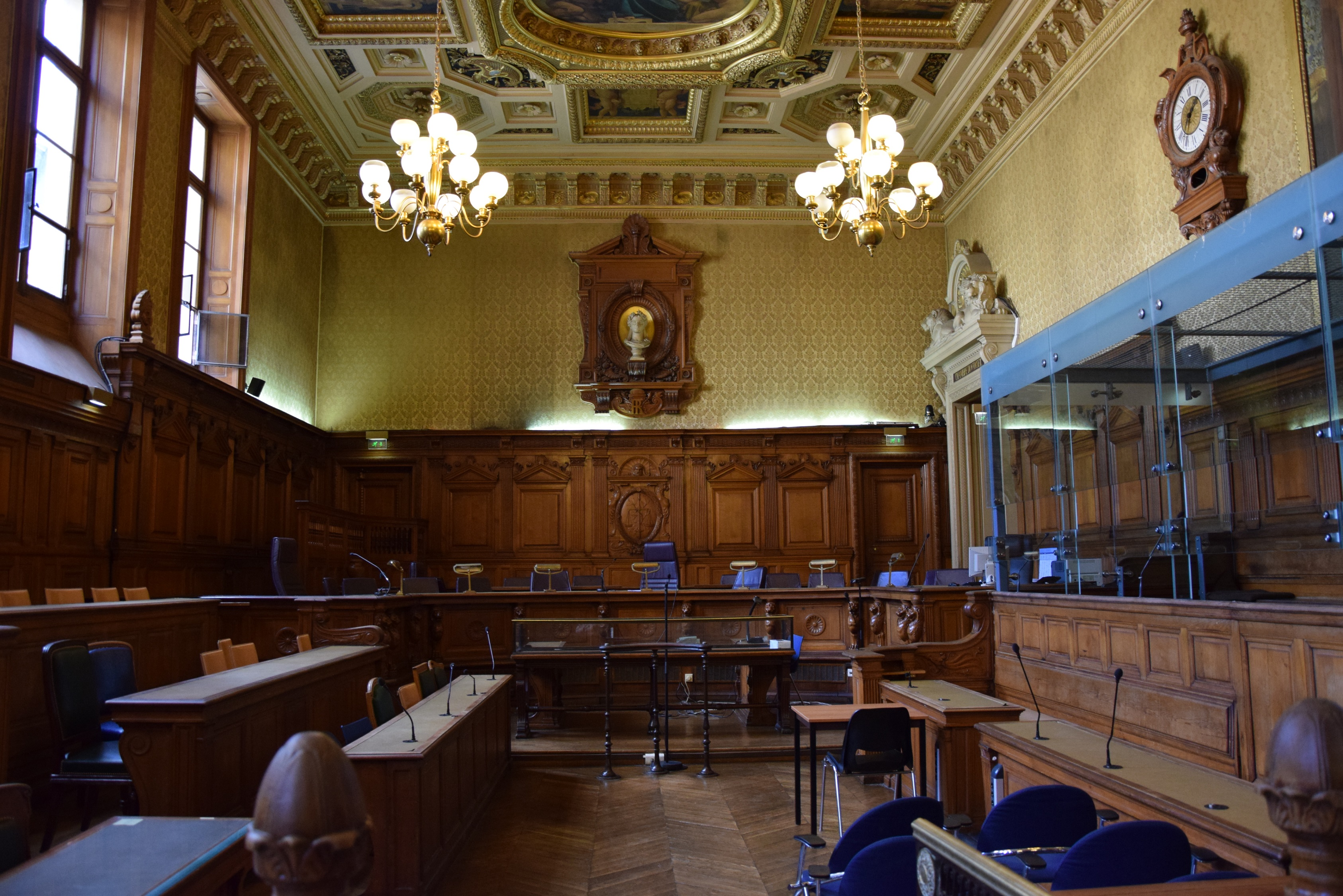
The Salle Voltaire of the Court d'Assises

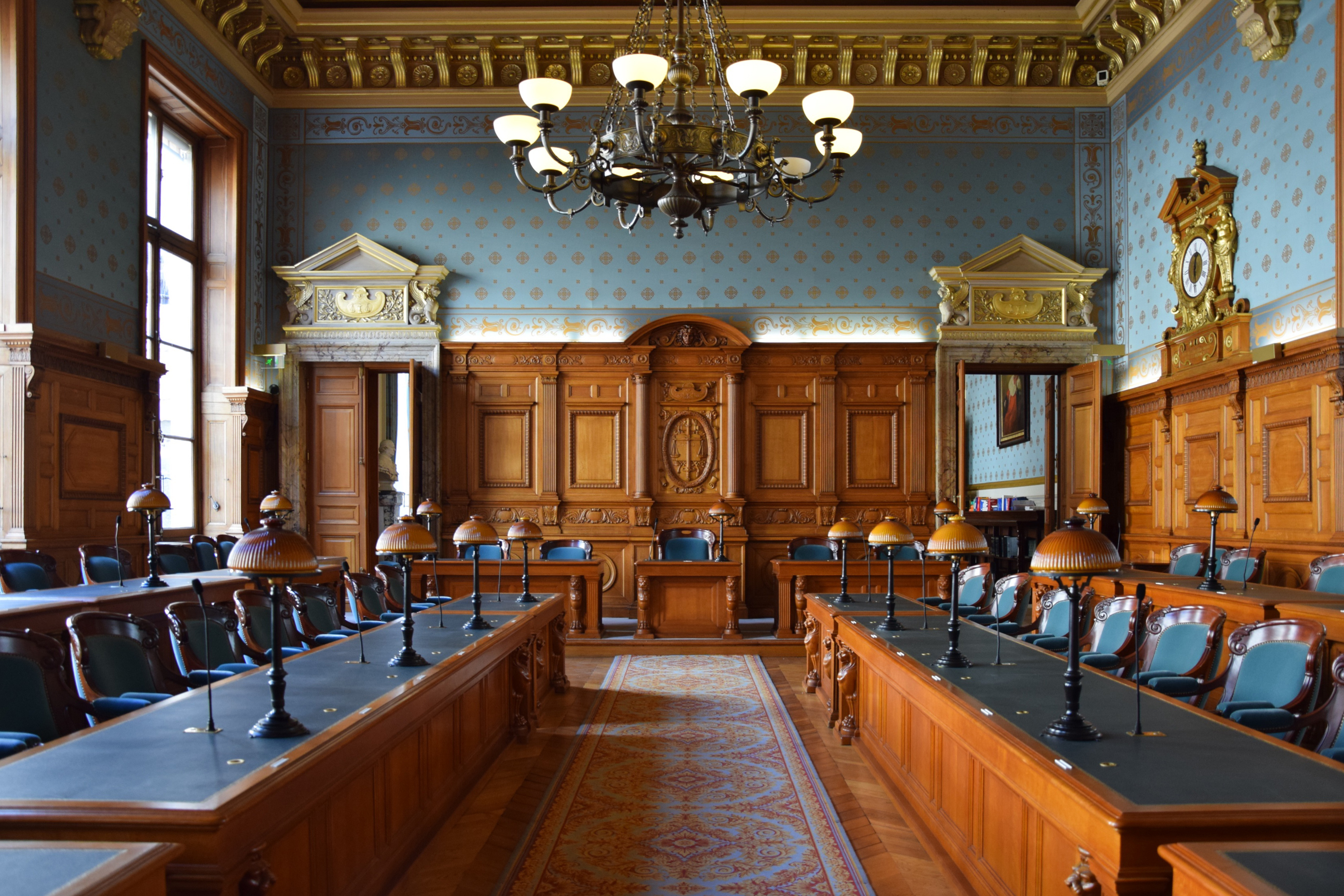
Hearing chamber for criminal cases in the Cour de Cassation

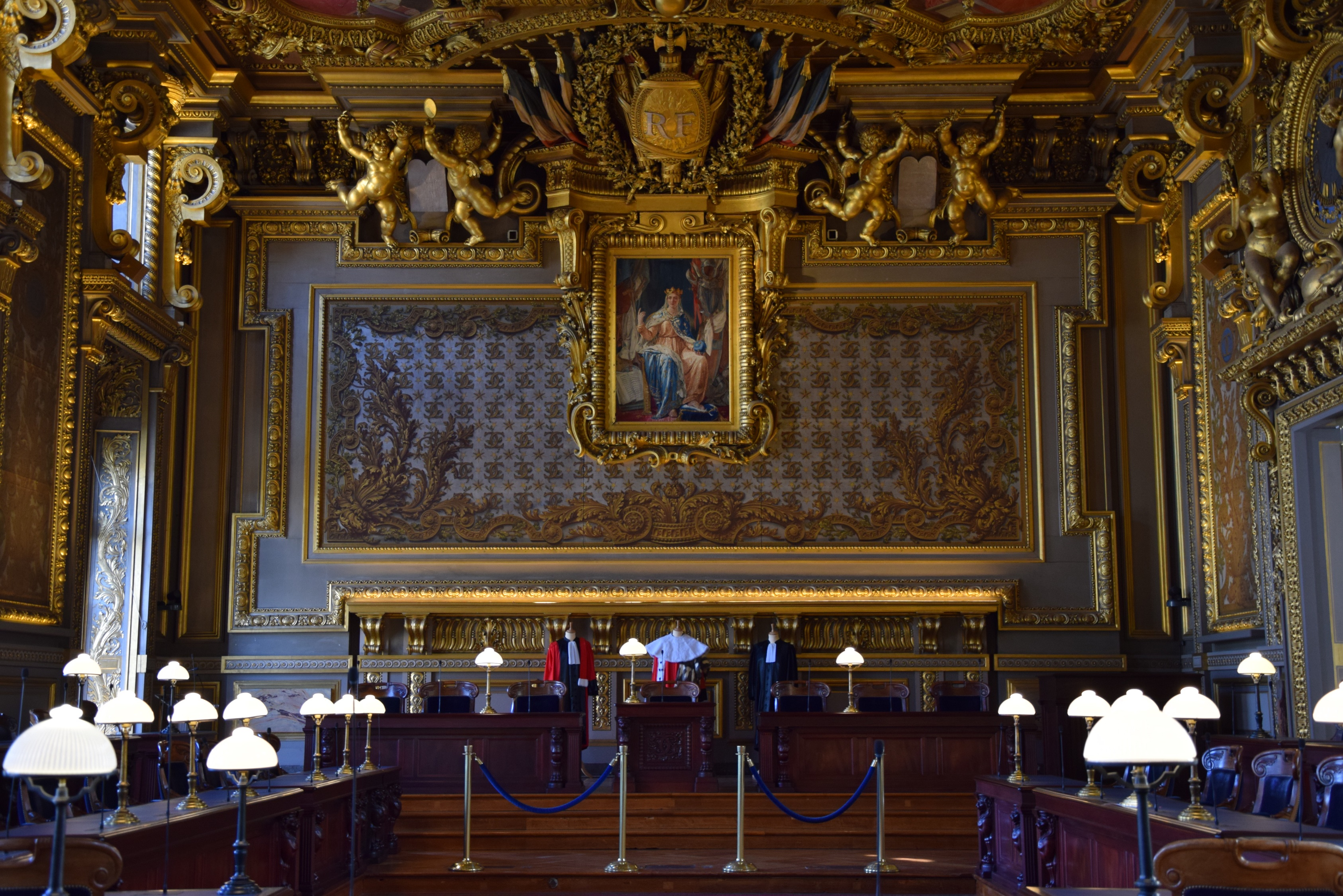
First civil hearing chamber of the Cour de Cassation

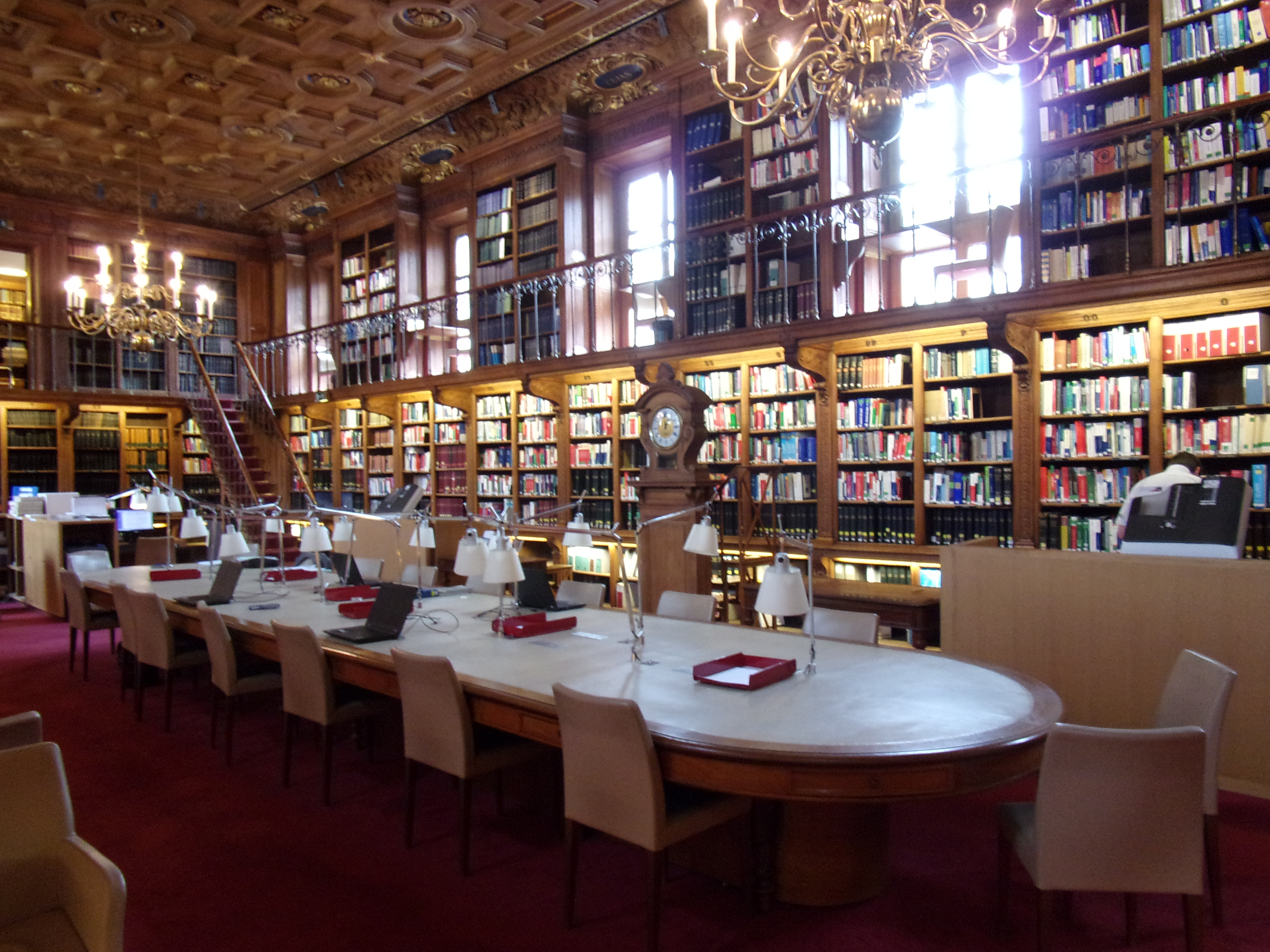
Library of the Cour de Cassation

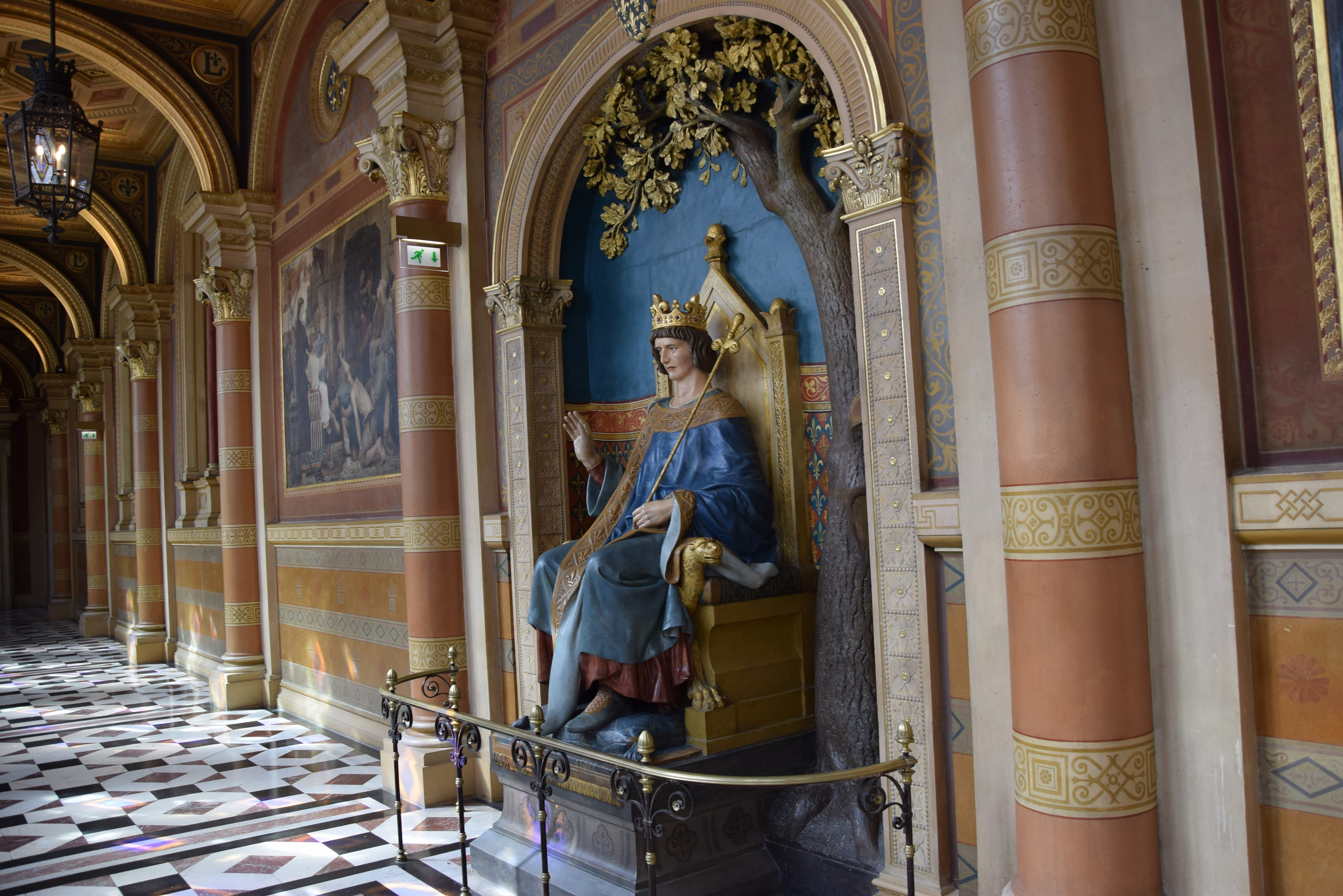
Gallery of Saint Louis (Louis IX) in the Cour de Cassation

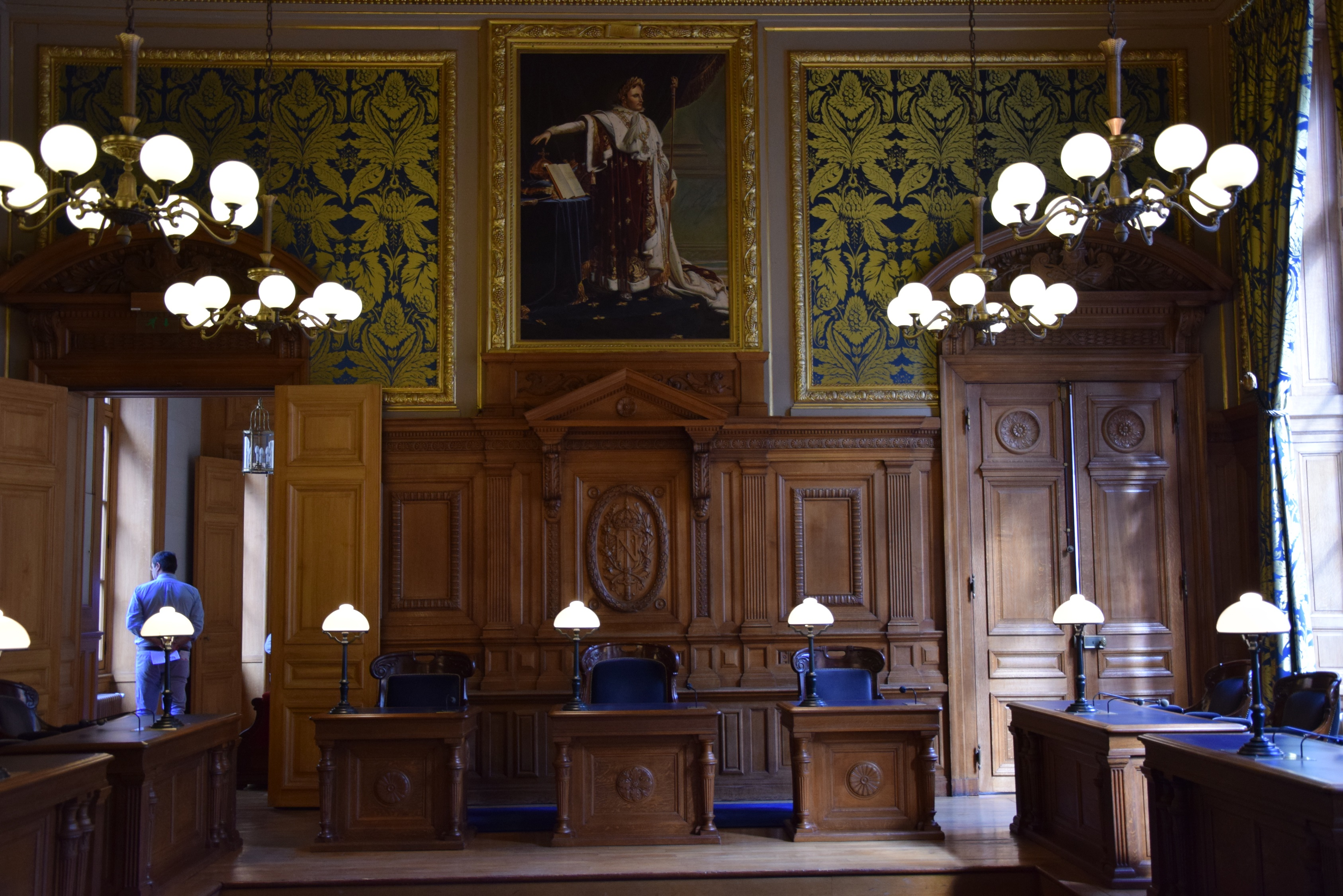
Decoration in Commercial Chamber of the Cour de Cassation

== Gallery ==
=== Plans and maps ===
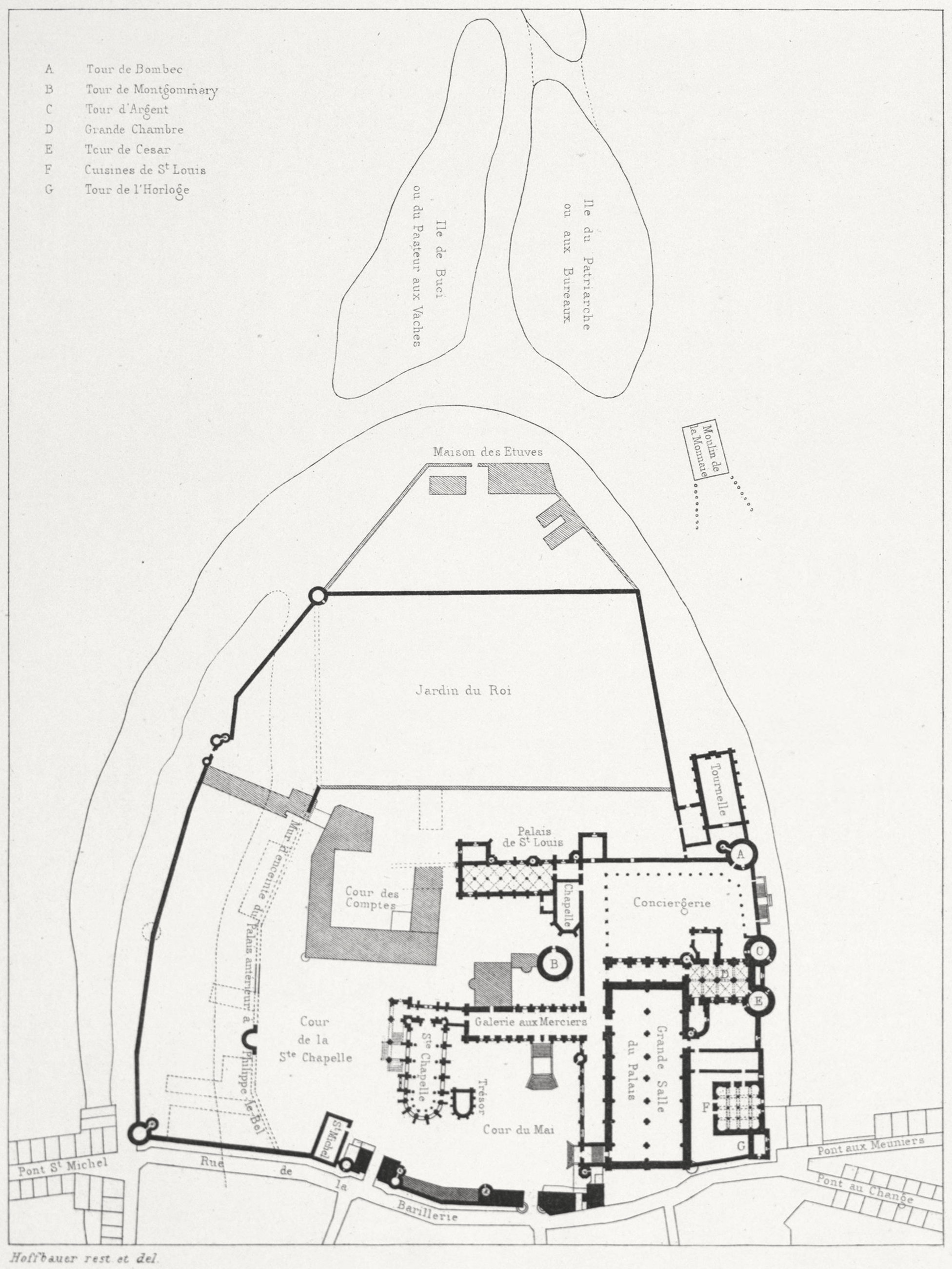
19th-century reconstructed plan of the area in 1380, engraving by Theodor Josef Hubert Hoffbauer

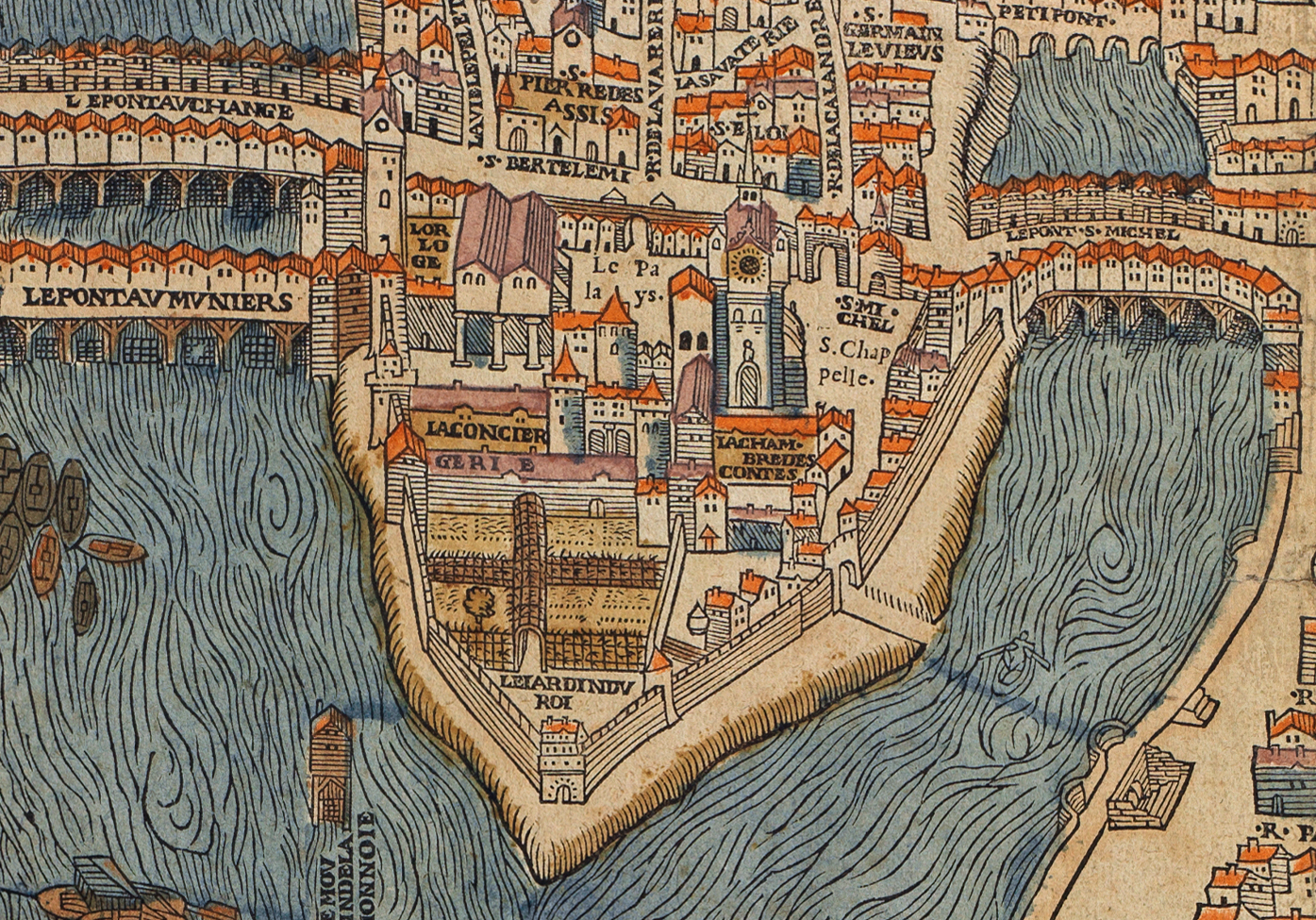
Plan of Paris, 1550

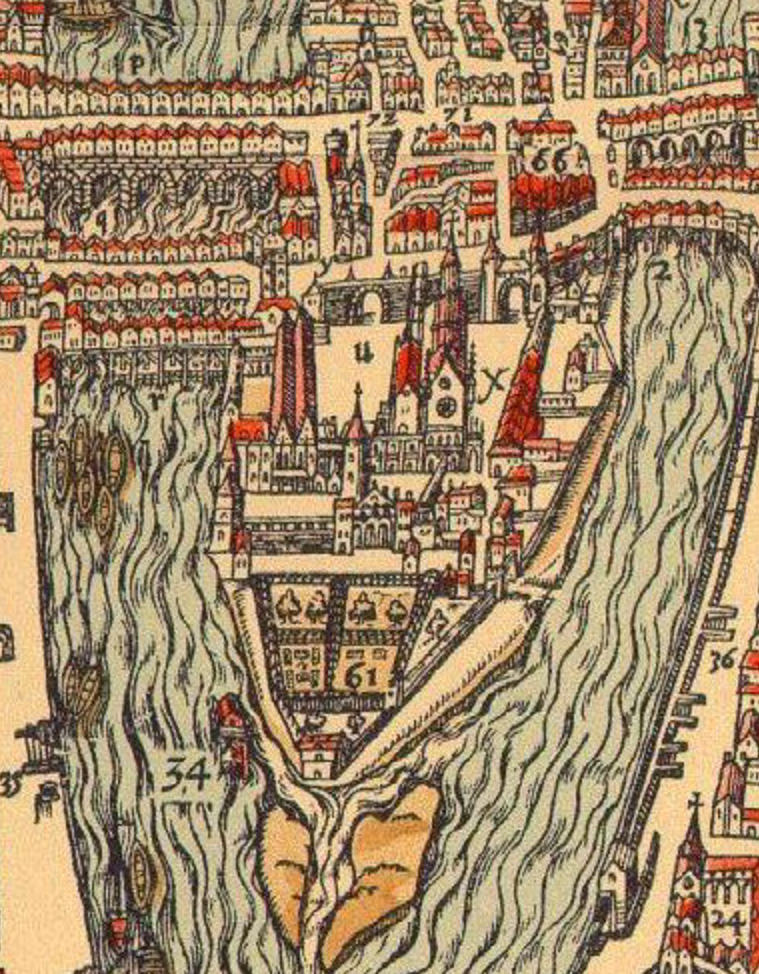
Detail of the Plan de Belleforest, 1575

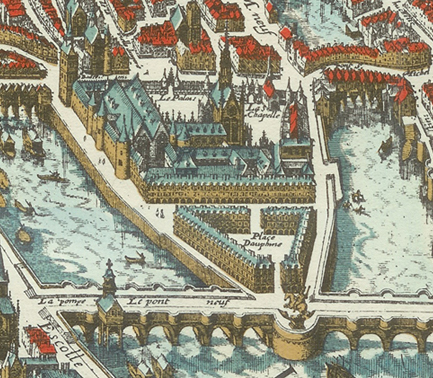
Detail of the Plan de Mérian, 1615

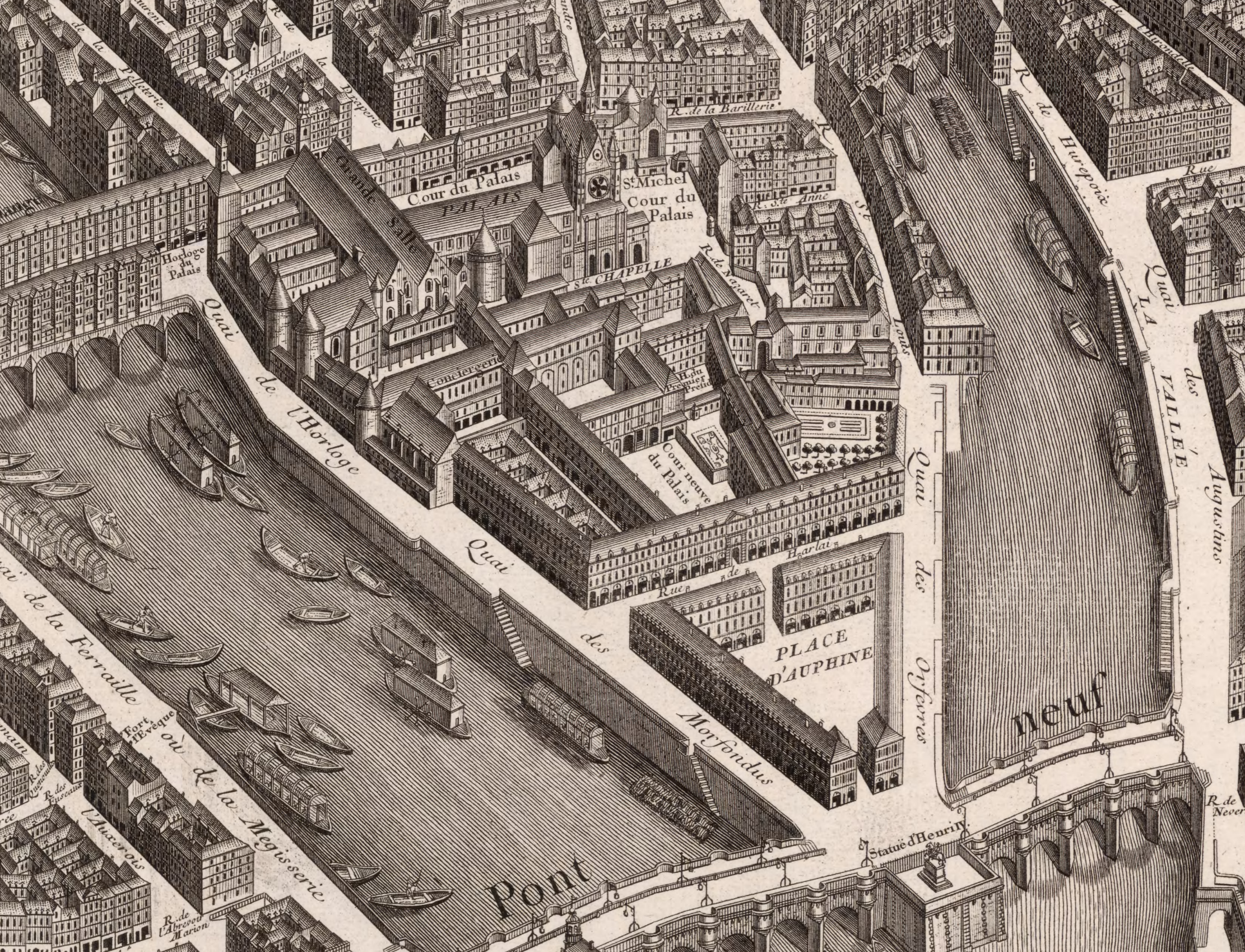
The Palais in the 1730s, detail of the Turgot map of Paris

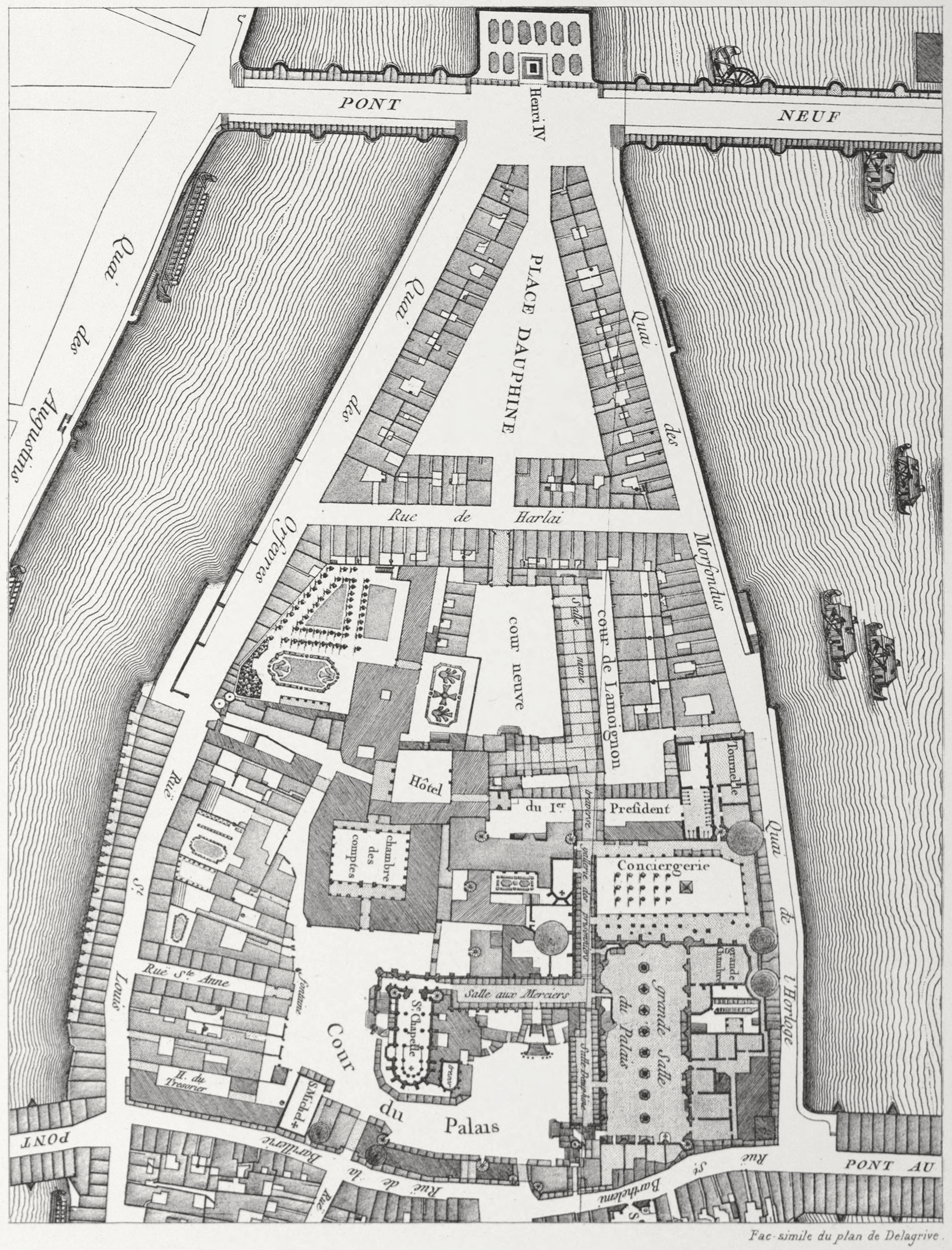
19th-century reconstructed plan of the area in 1754, engraving by Theodor Josef Hubert Hoffbauer

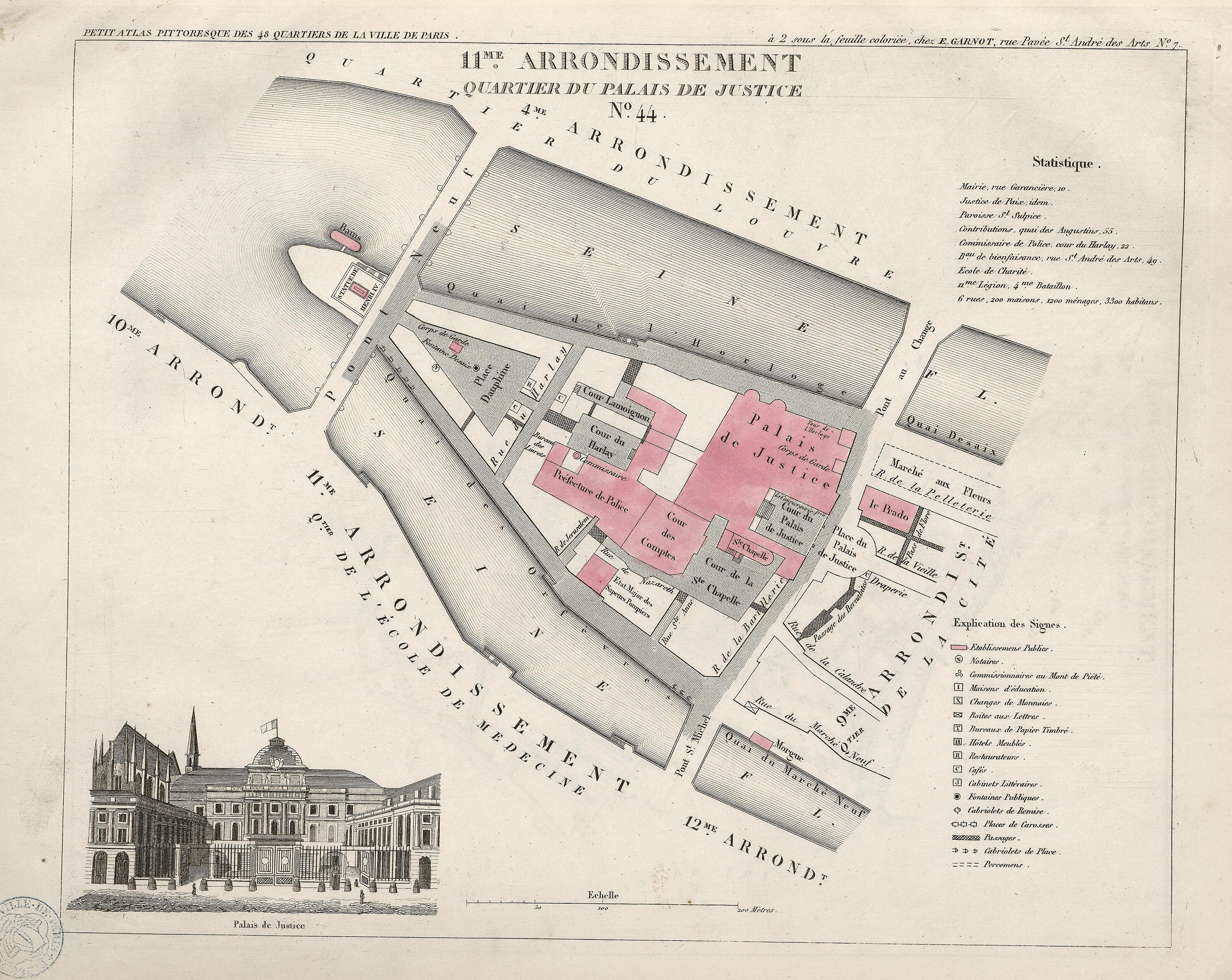
Map of the area in 1834

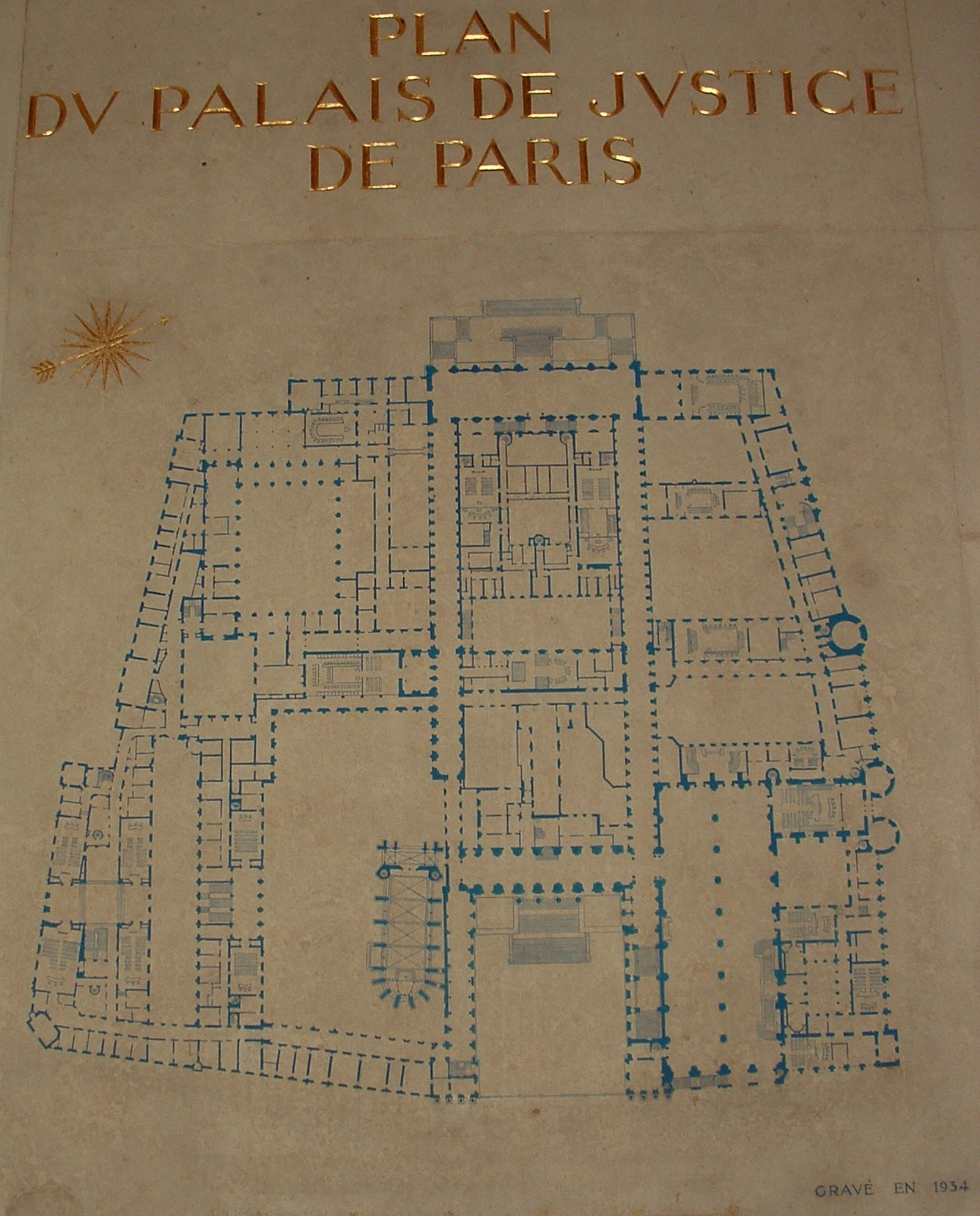
Plan of the first floor in 1934, engraved on a wall inside the building

=== Historical images ===
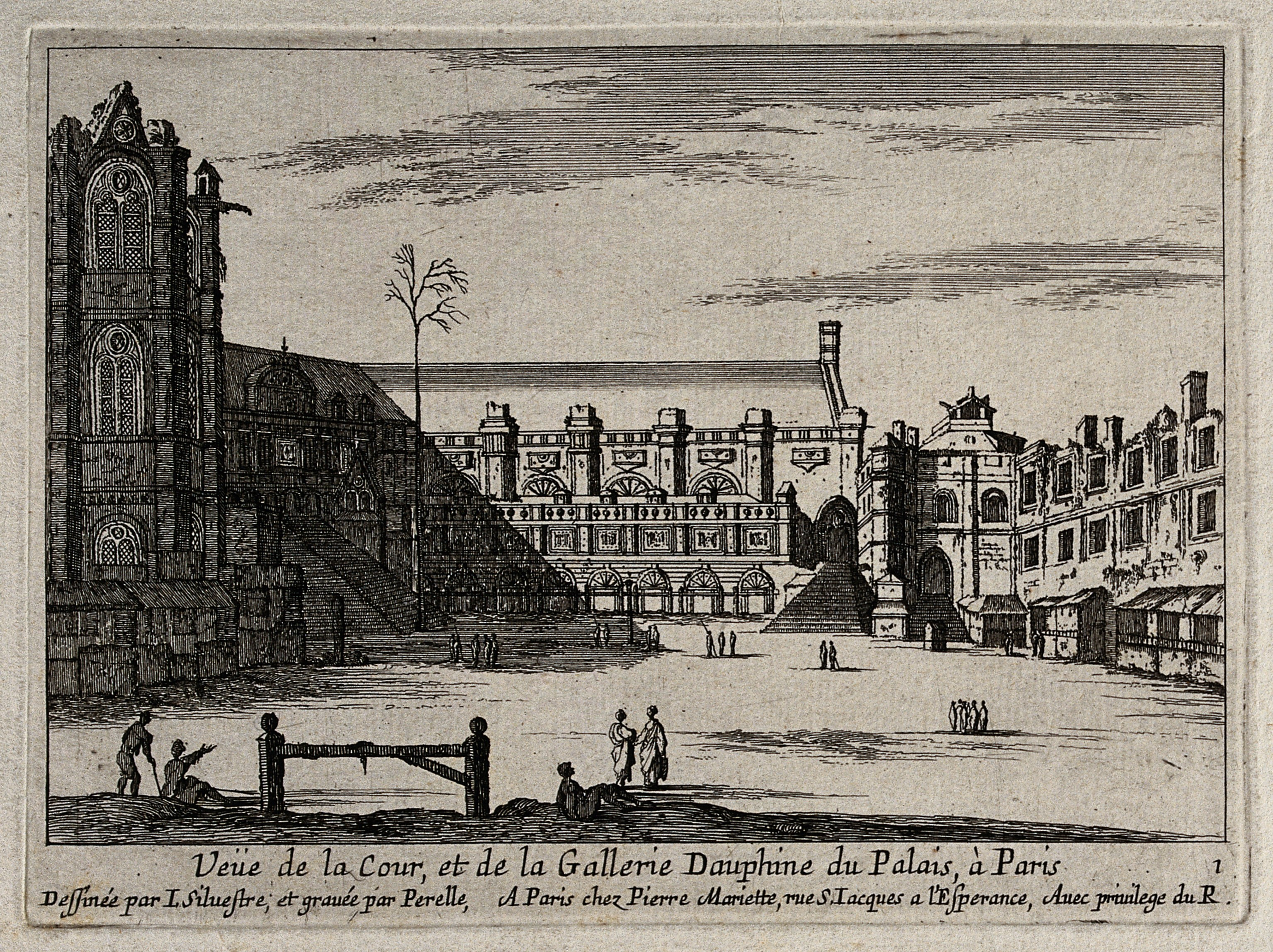
Sainte-Chapelle and Grande-Salle, by Israel Silvestre, mid-17th century

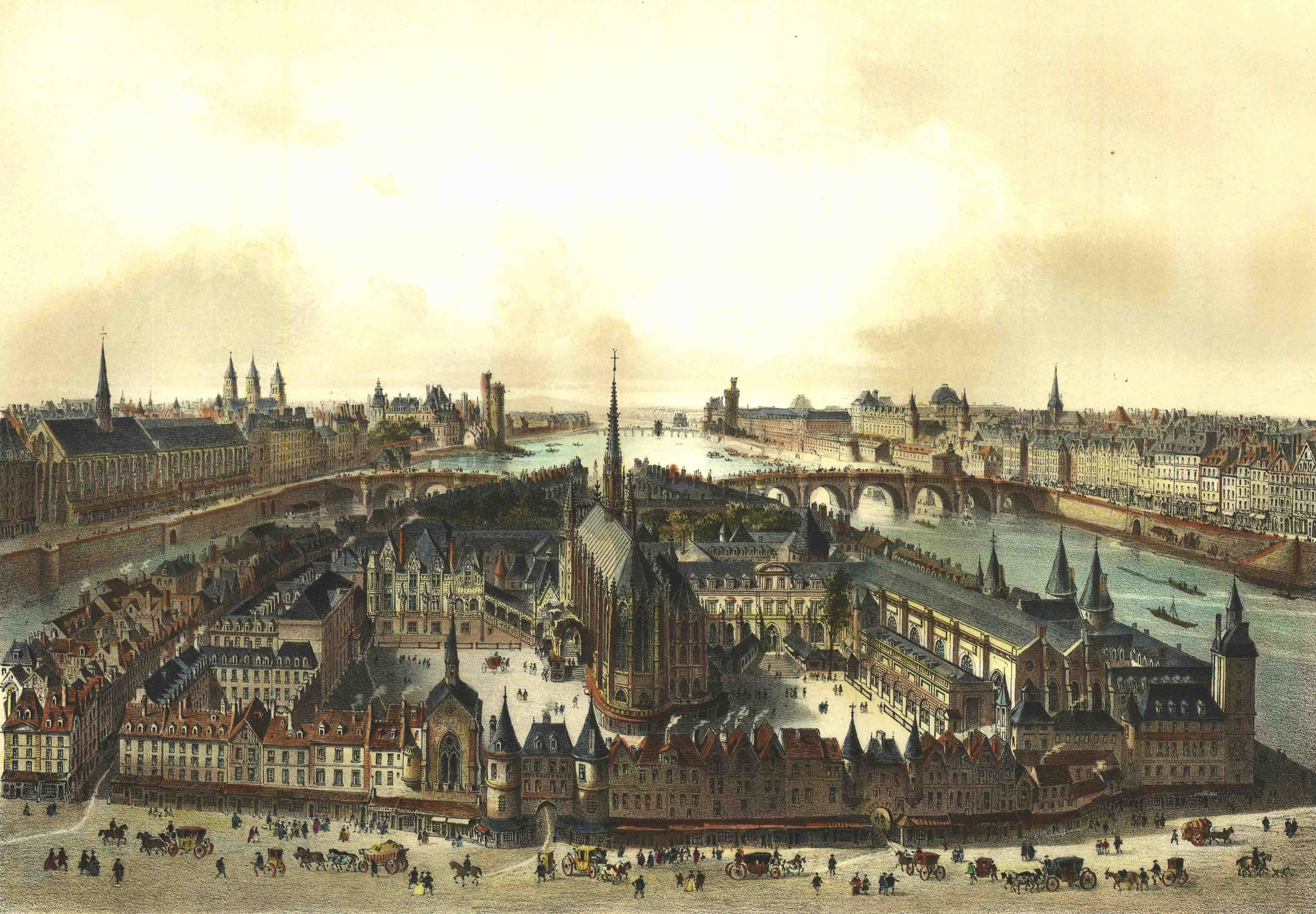
General view of the Palais by Israel Silvestre, mid-17th century

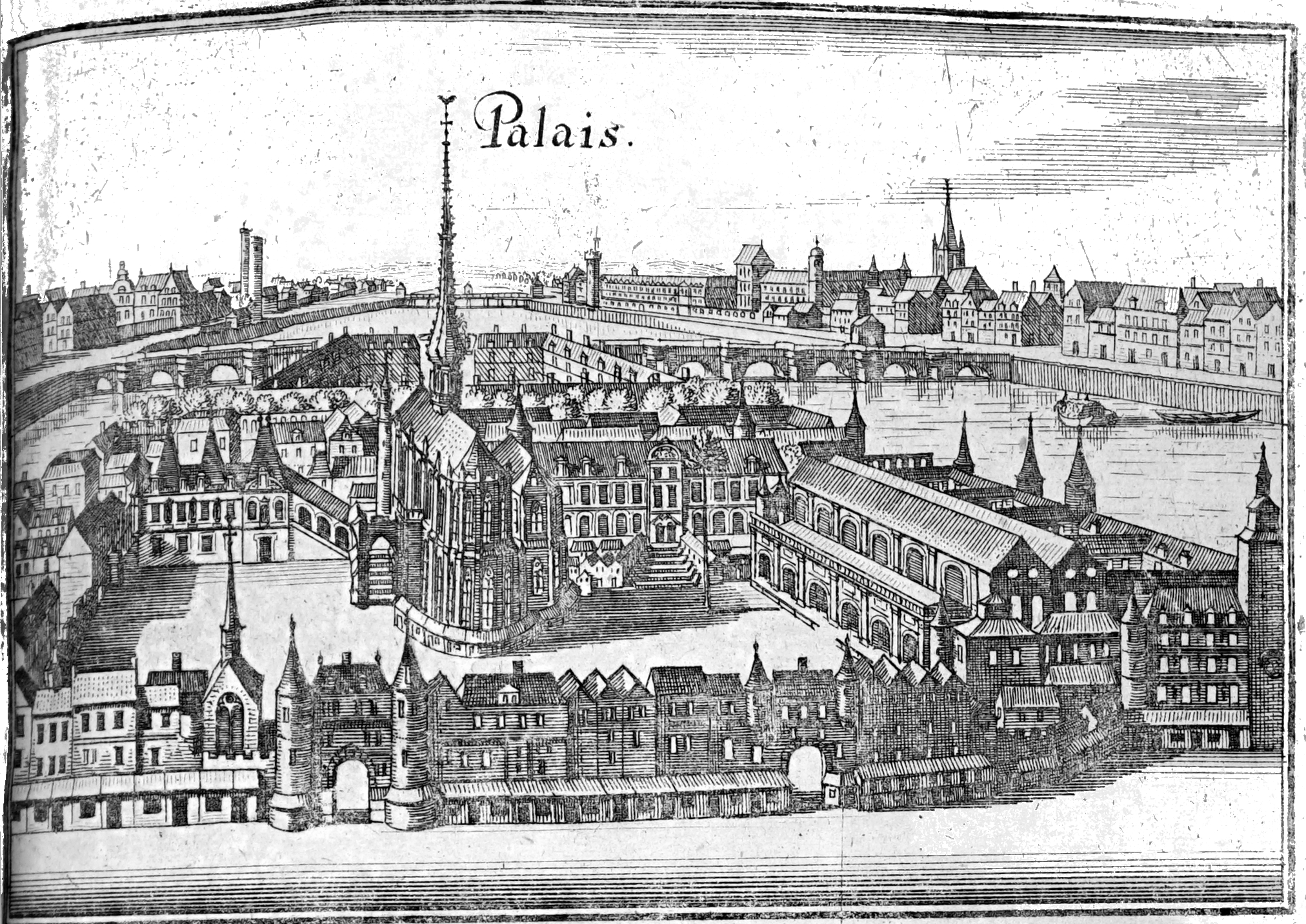
The Palais de la Cité in 1655

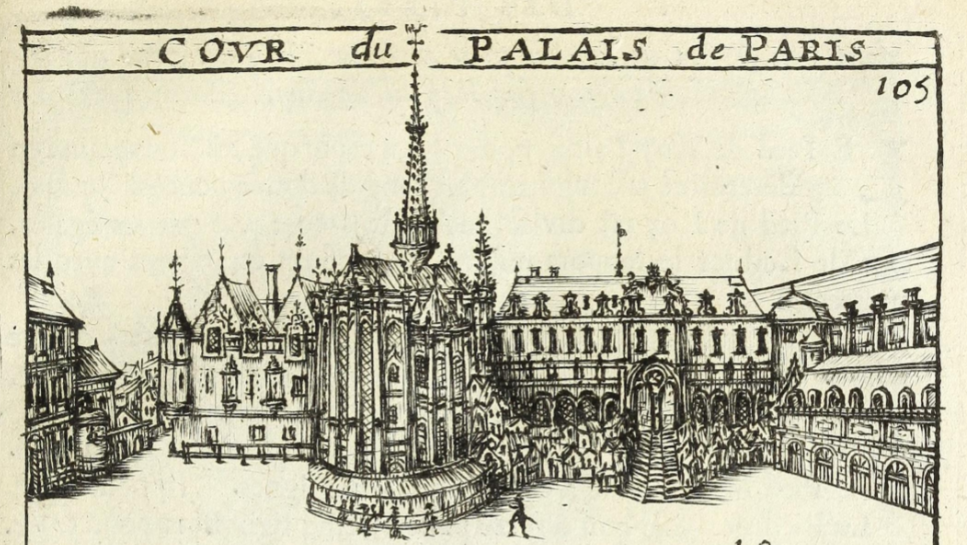
Cour du Mai in 1702

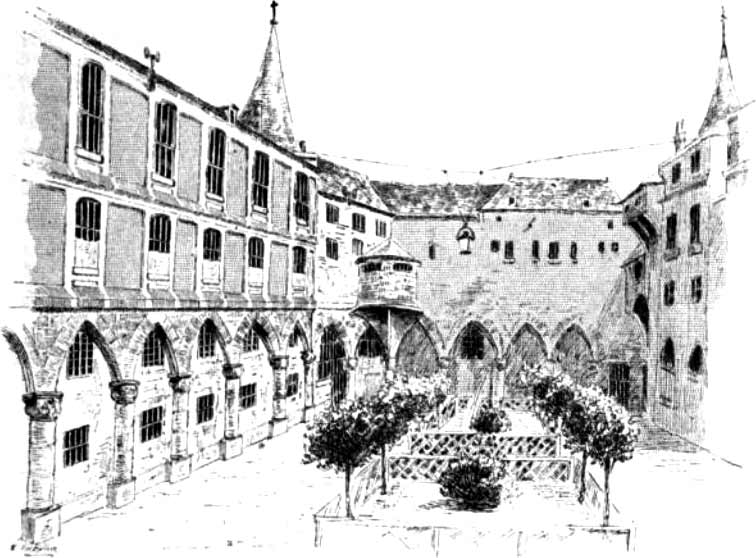
Main interior court (Cour des Hommes) of the Conciergerie in the mid-19th-century, demolished shortly afterwards

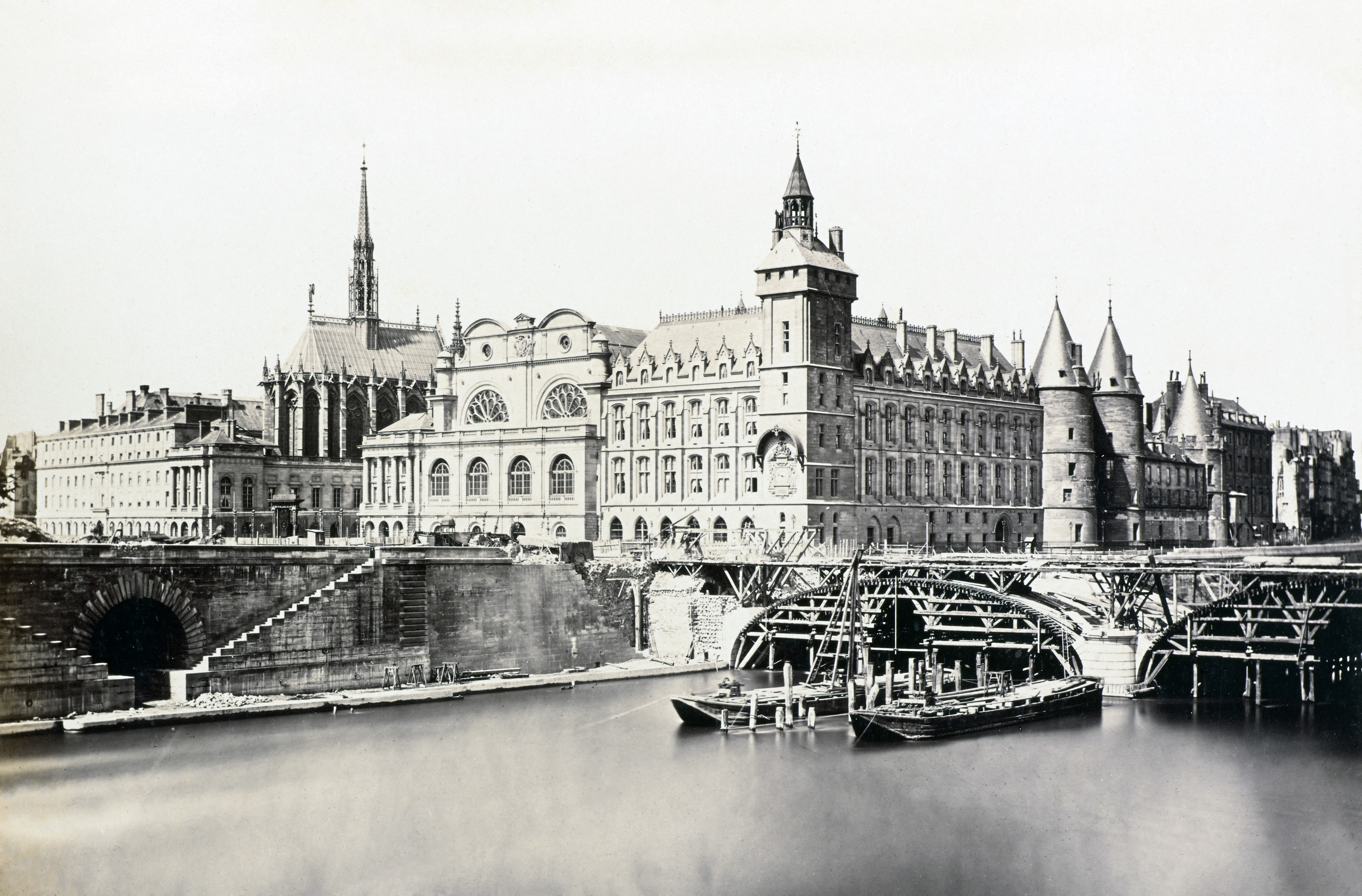
The Palais after partial reconstruction, 1859

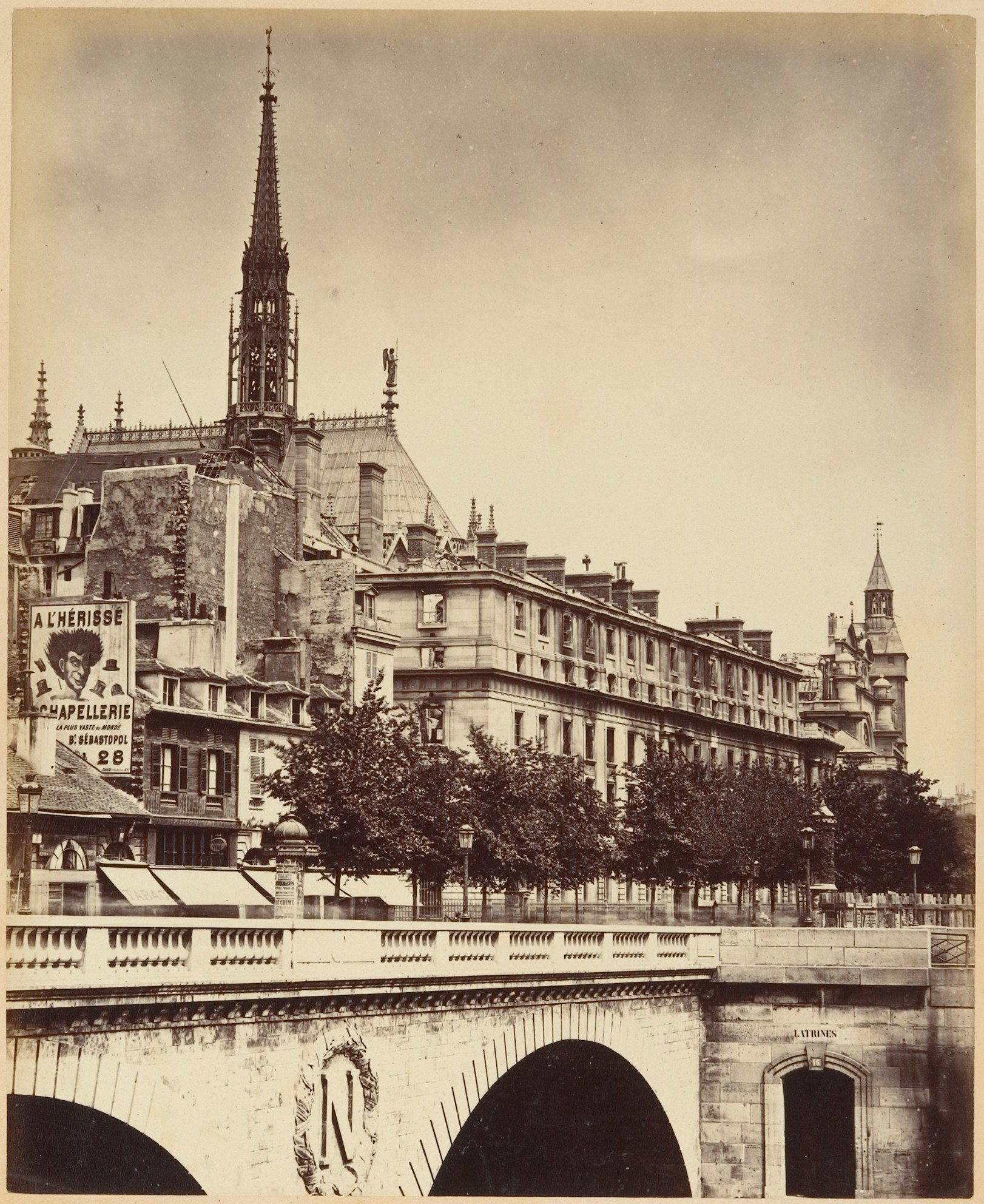
Eastern front on the Boulevard du Palais after the 1871 fire

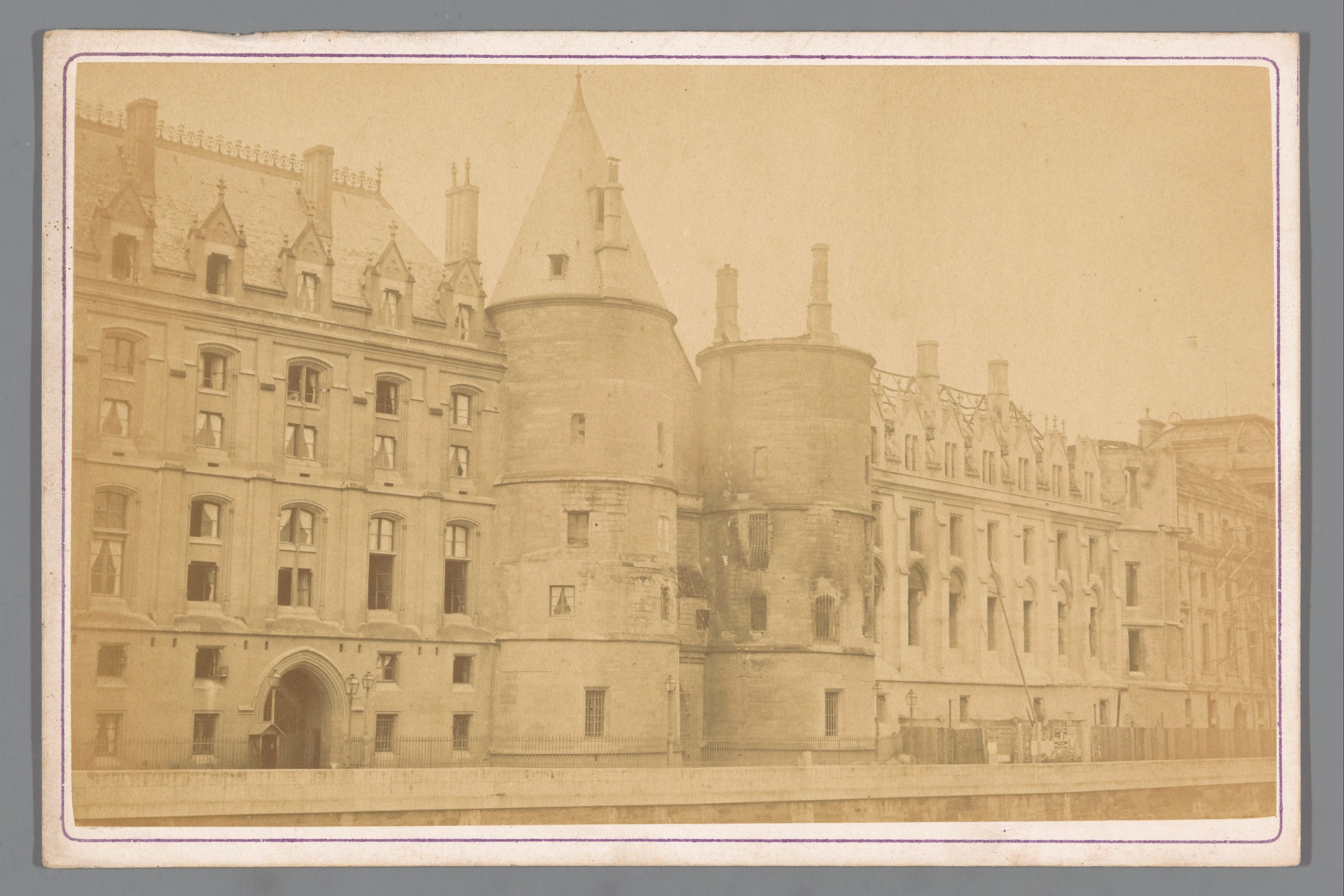
Northern front after the 1871 fire

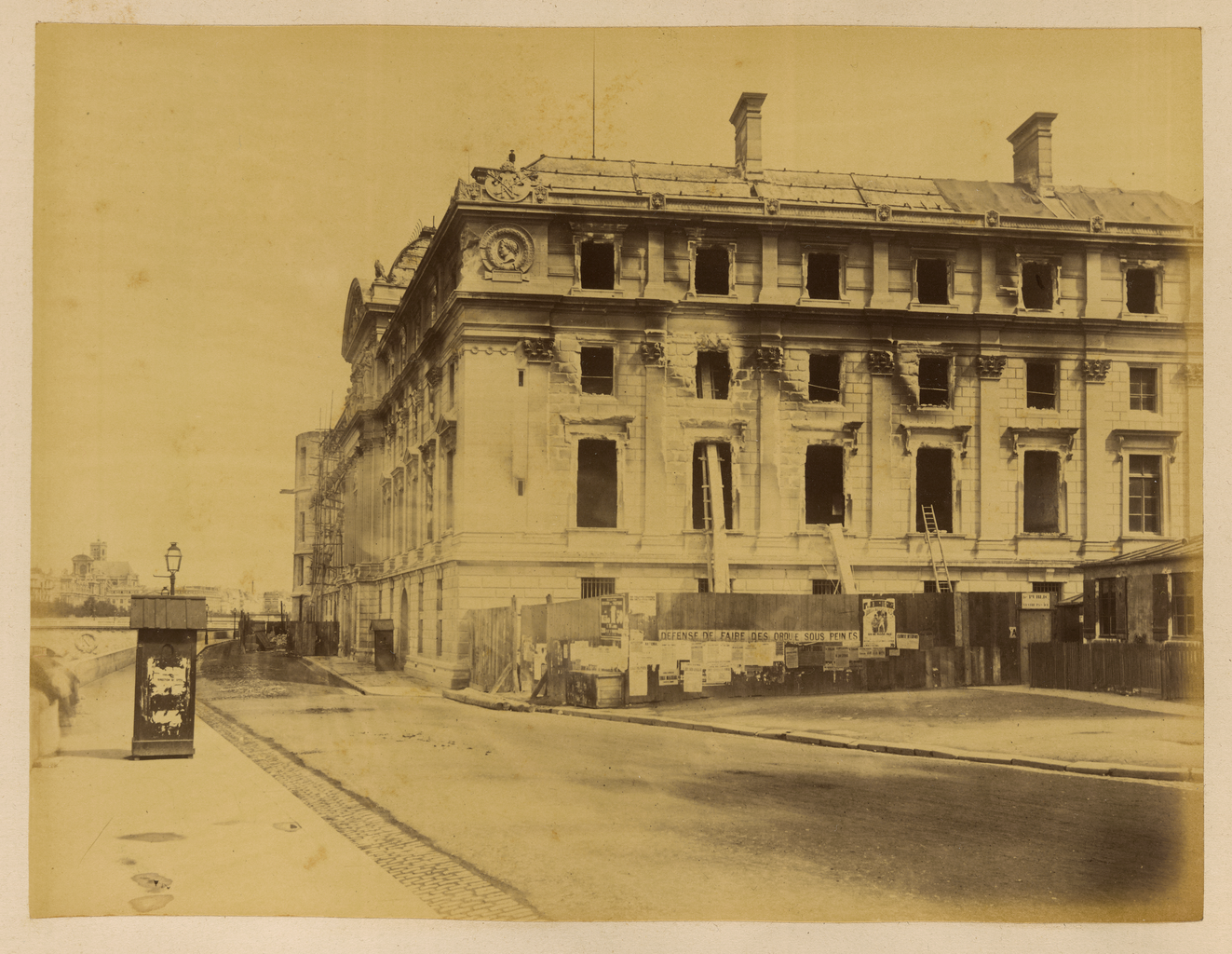
The recently completed Cour de Cassation damaged by fire, 1871

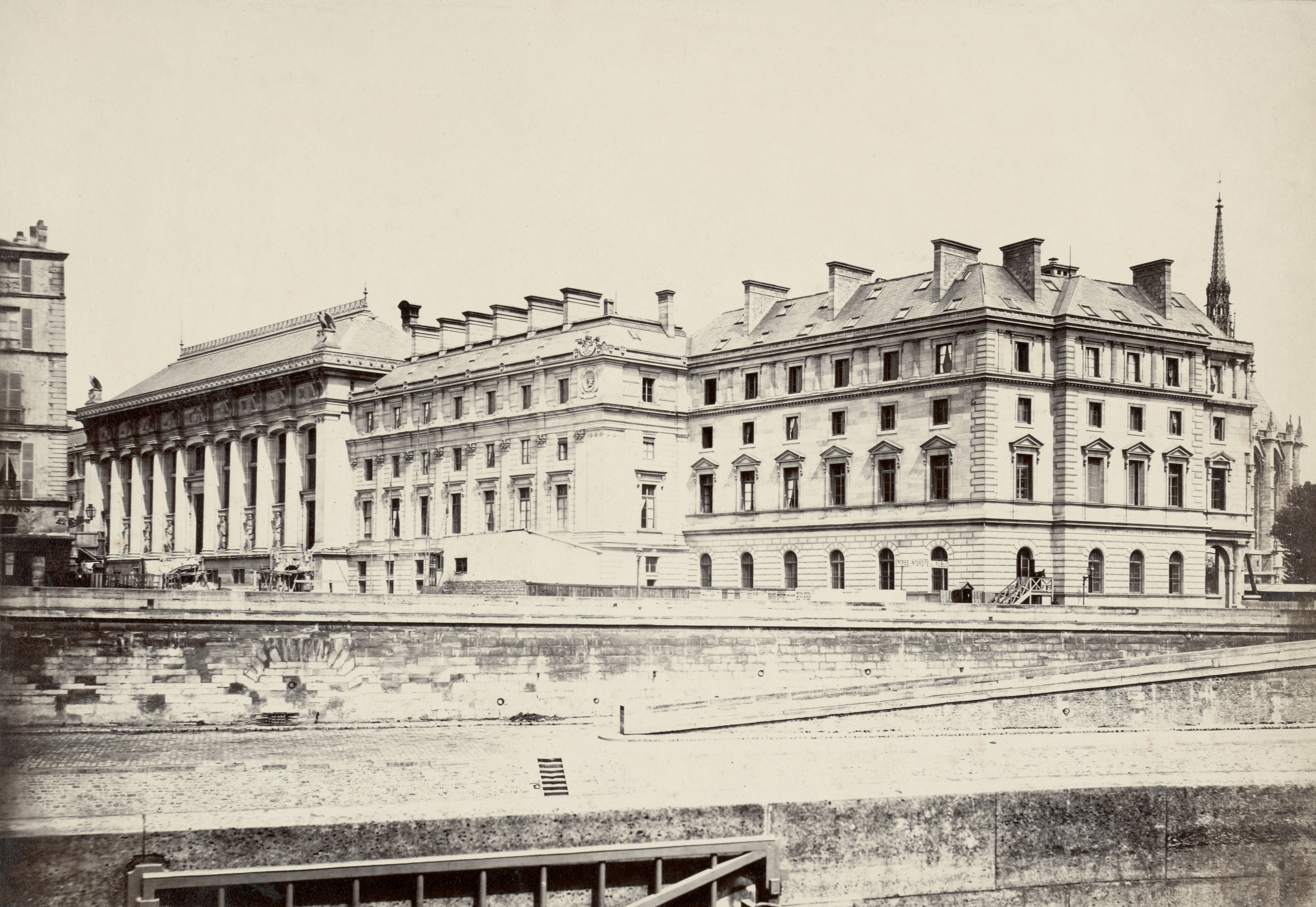
Photograph from the southwest, early 1870s

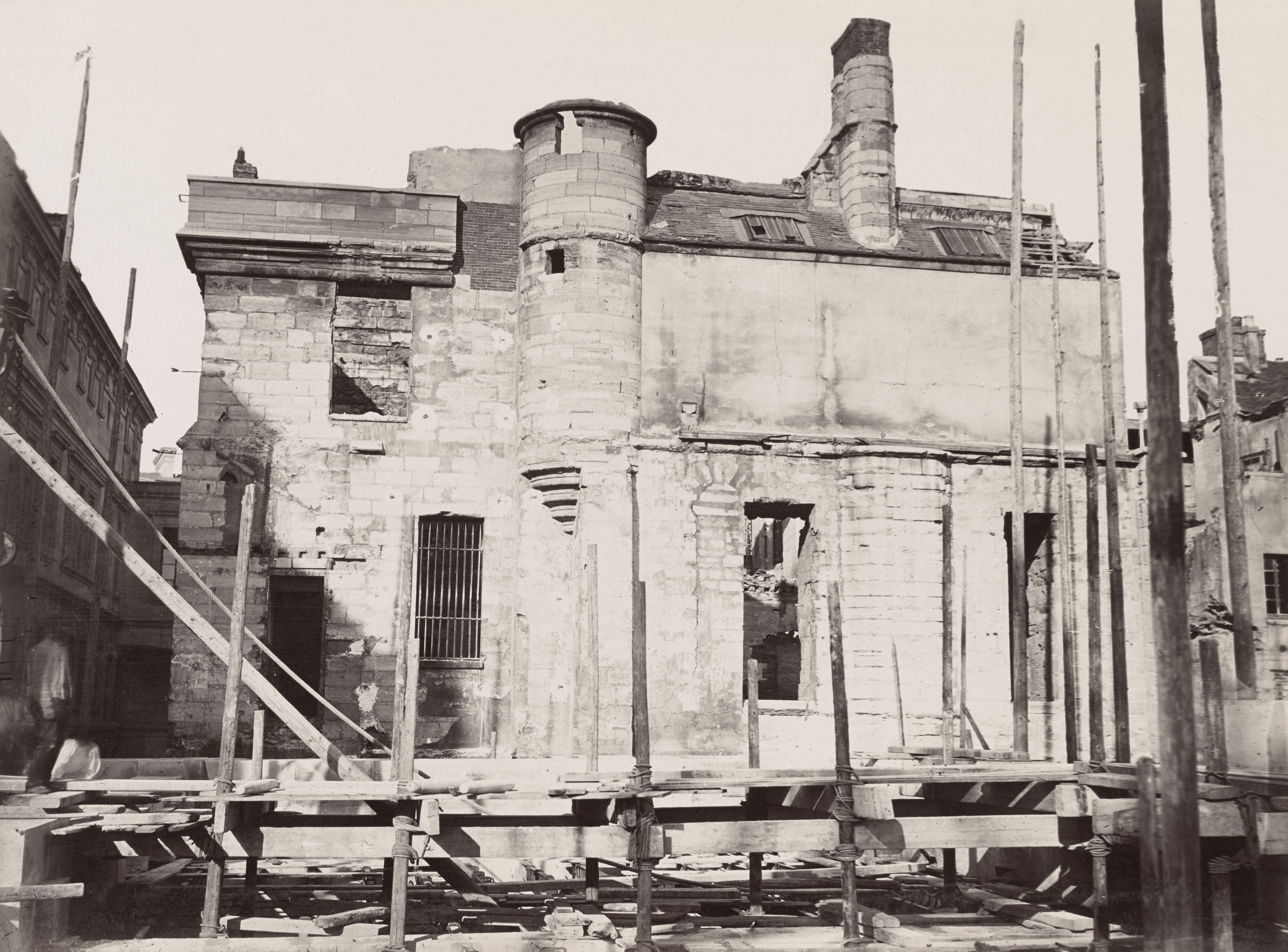
Demolition of medieval buildings, late 1870s

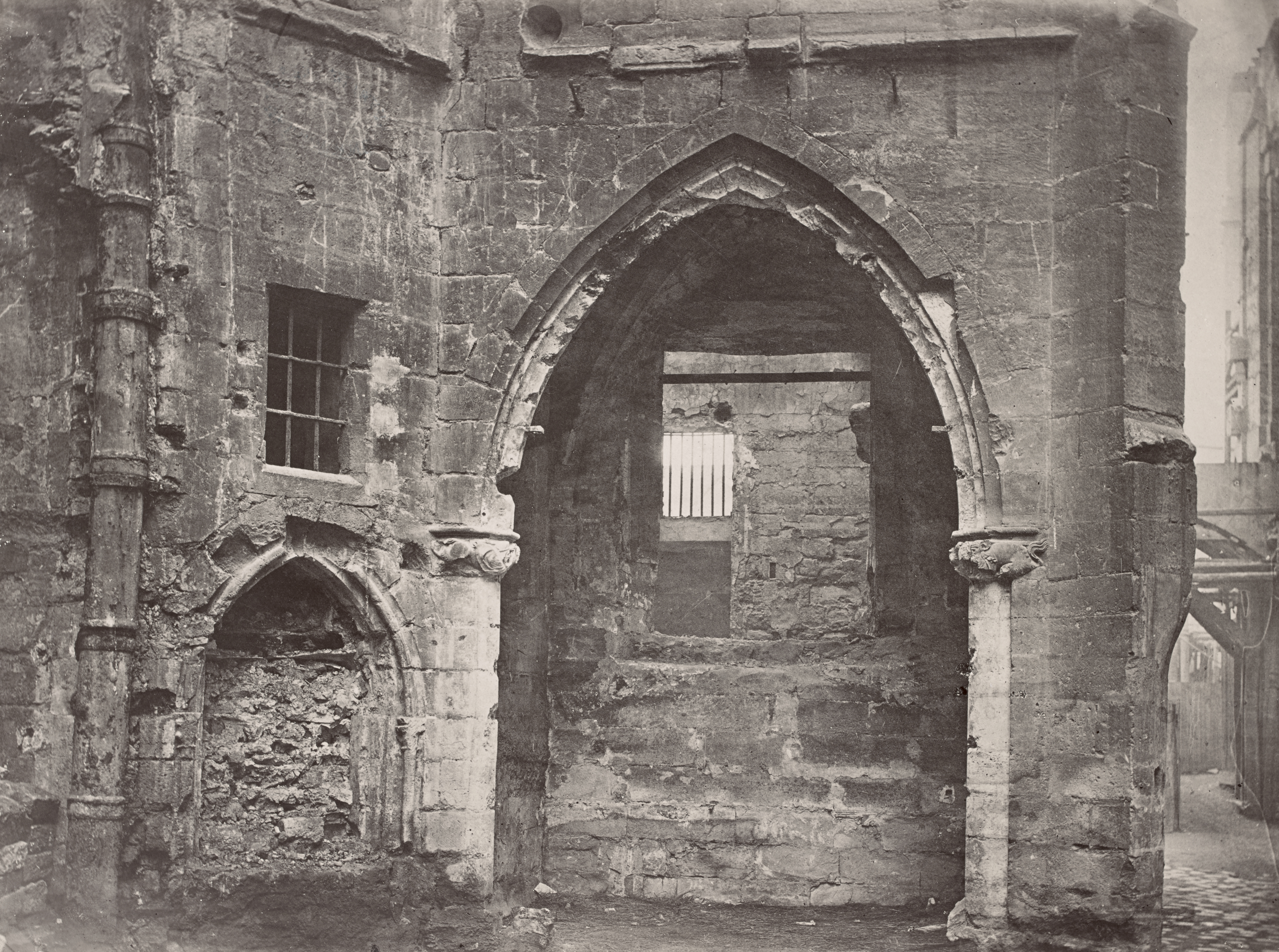
Demolition of medieval buildings, late 1870s

=== Reconstructions ===
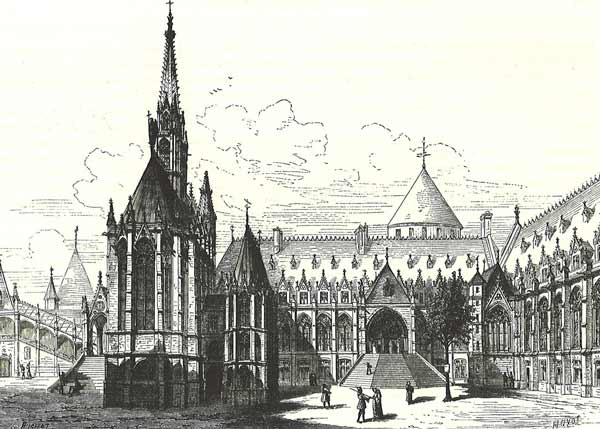
Cour du Mai in the 16th century, unknown author

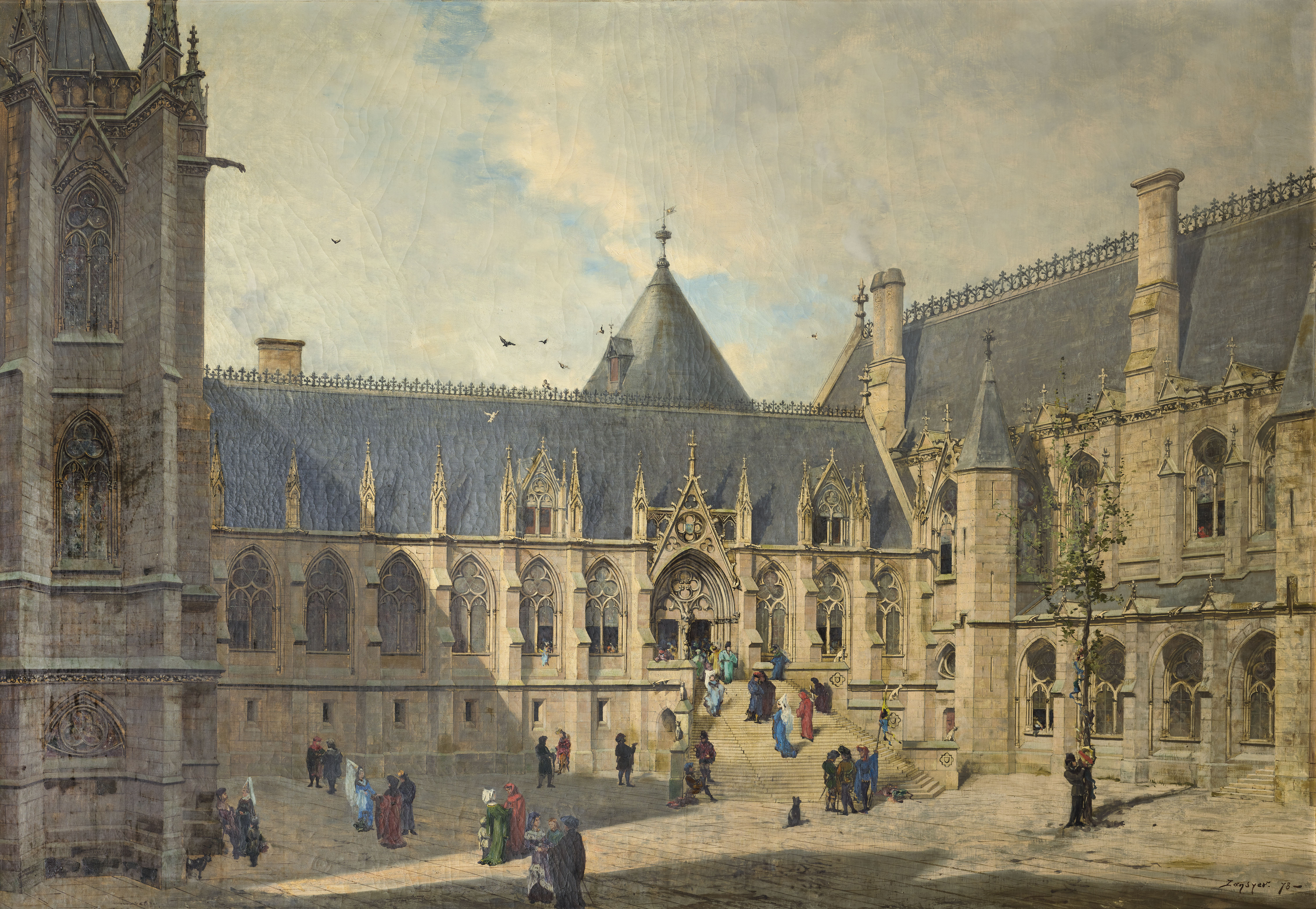
Cour du Mai in the late Middle Ages, reconstruction by Emmanuel Lansyer, 1878

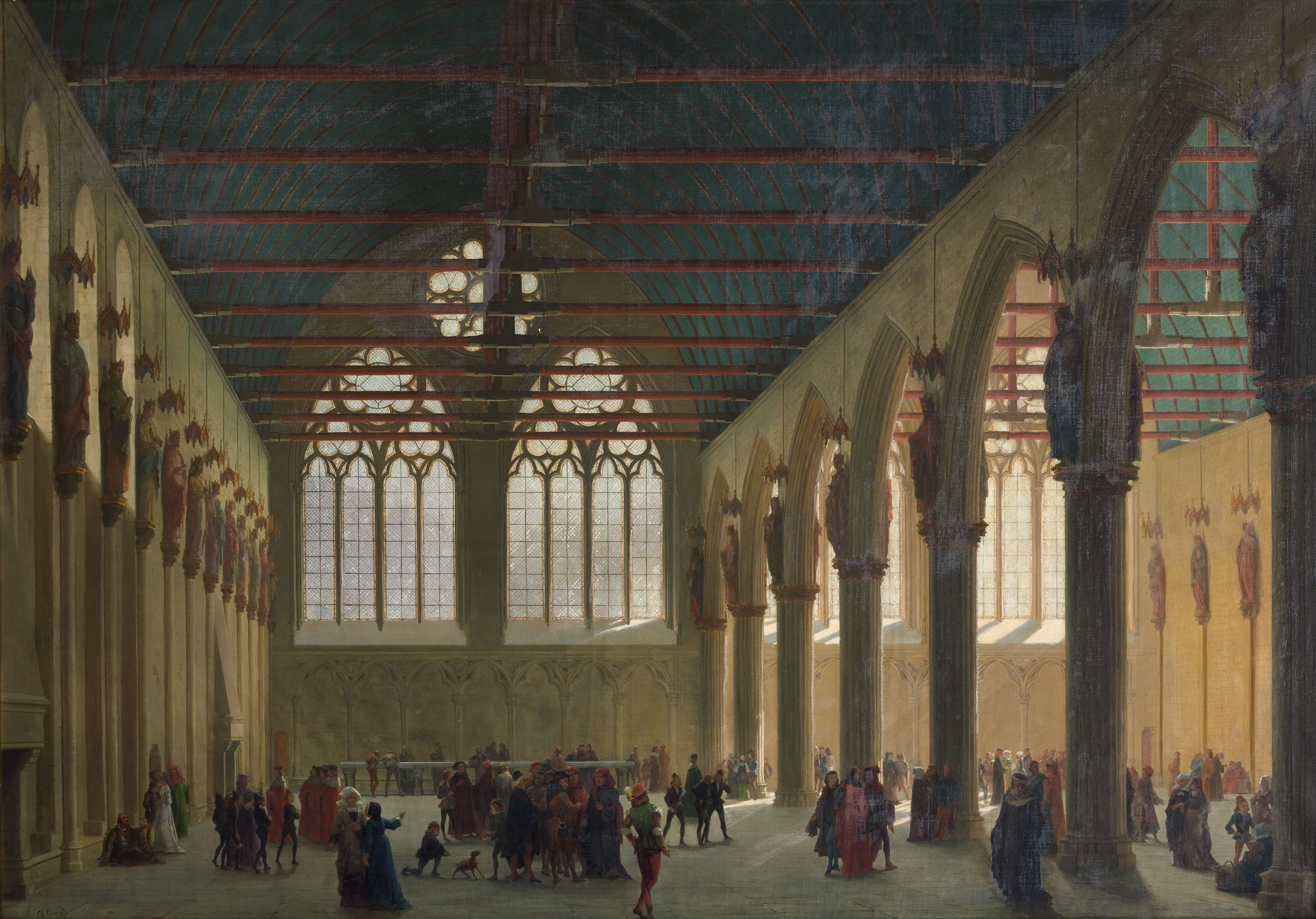
The Grande-Salle during the late Middle Ages, reconstruction by Sébastien Charles Giraud, 1878
