= French Gothic architecture =

Architectural style

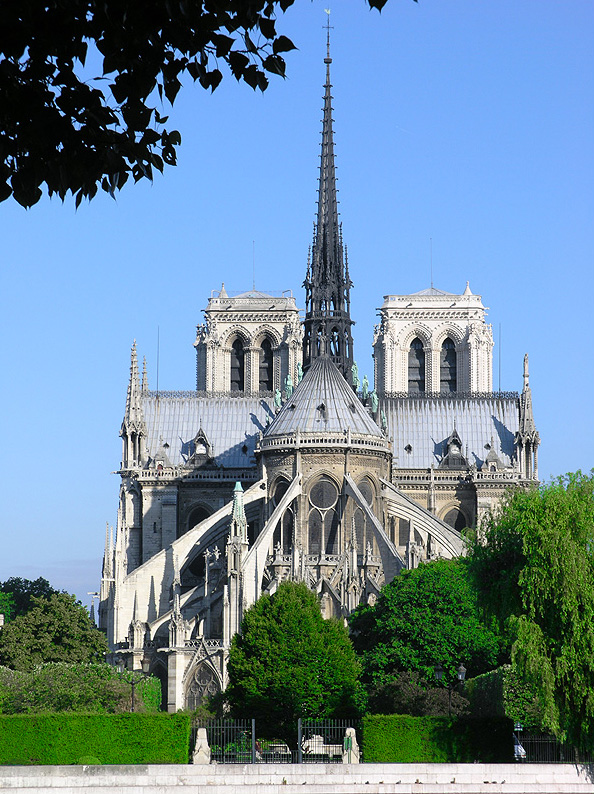
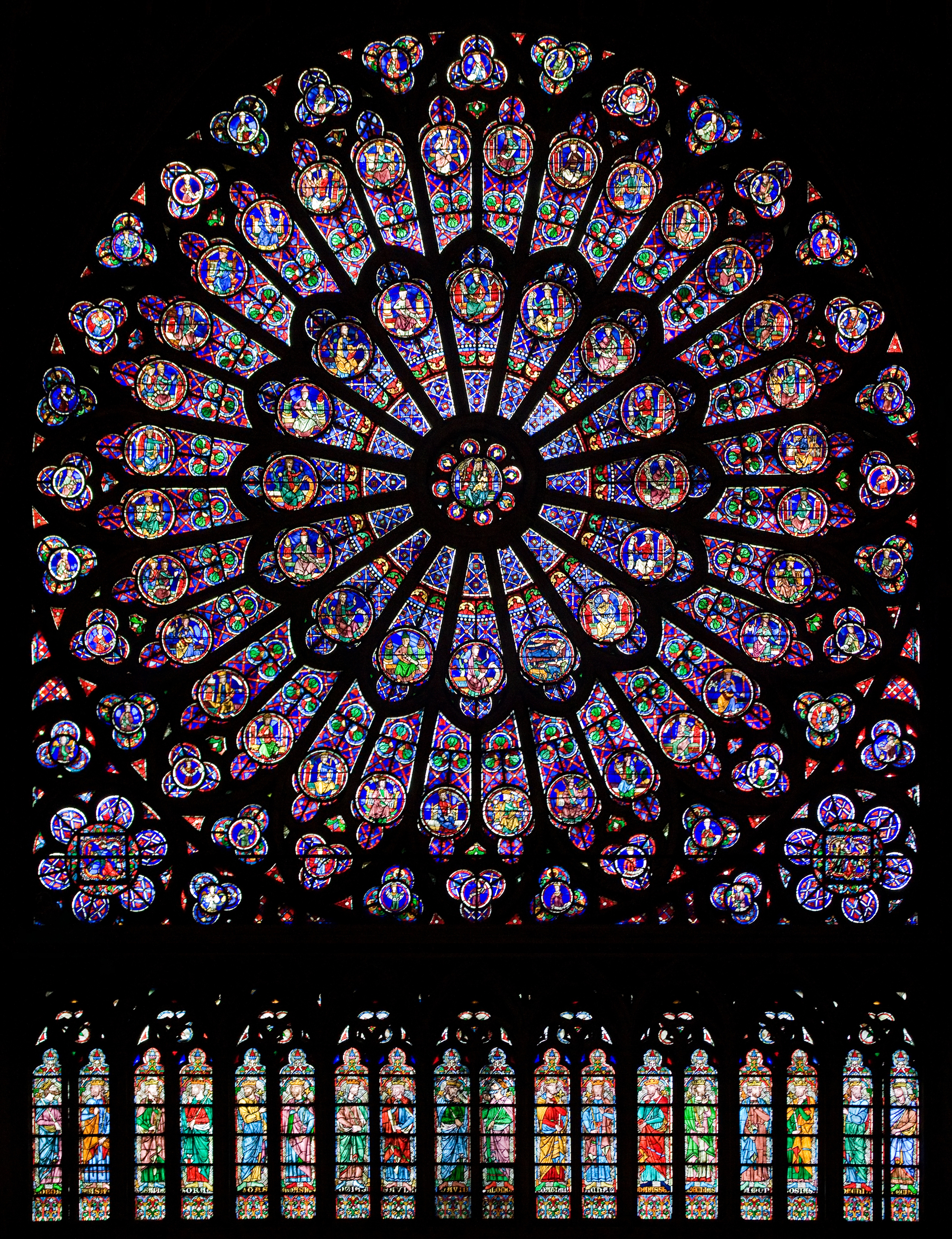
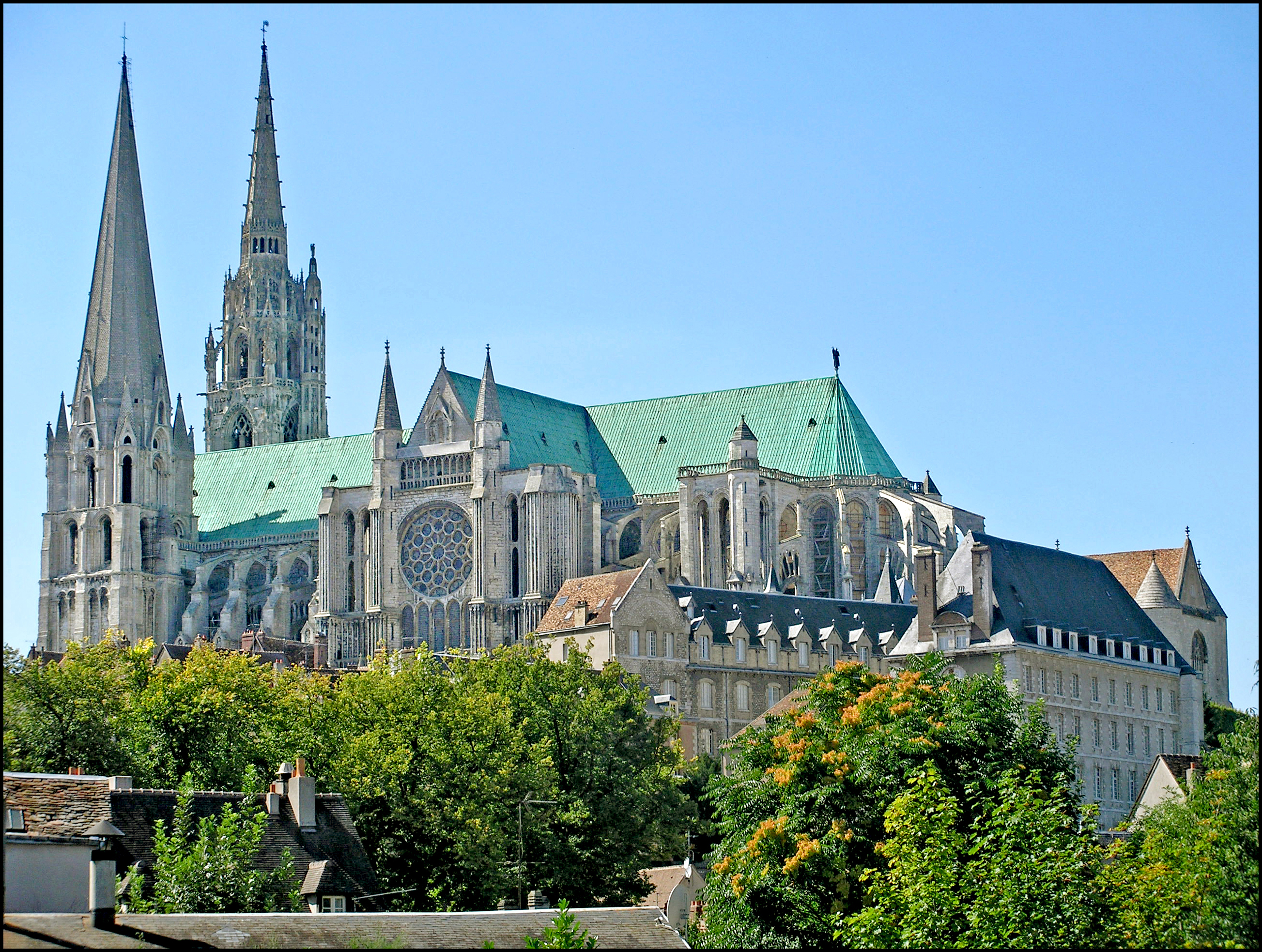
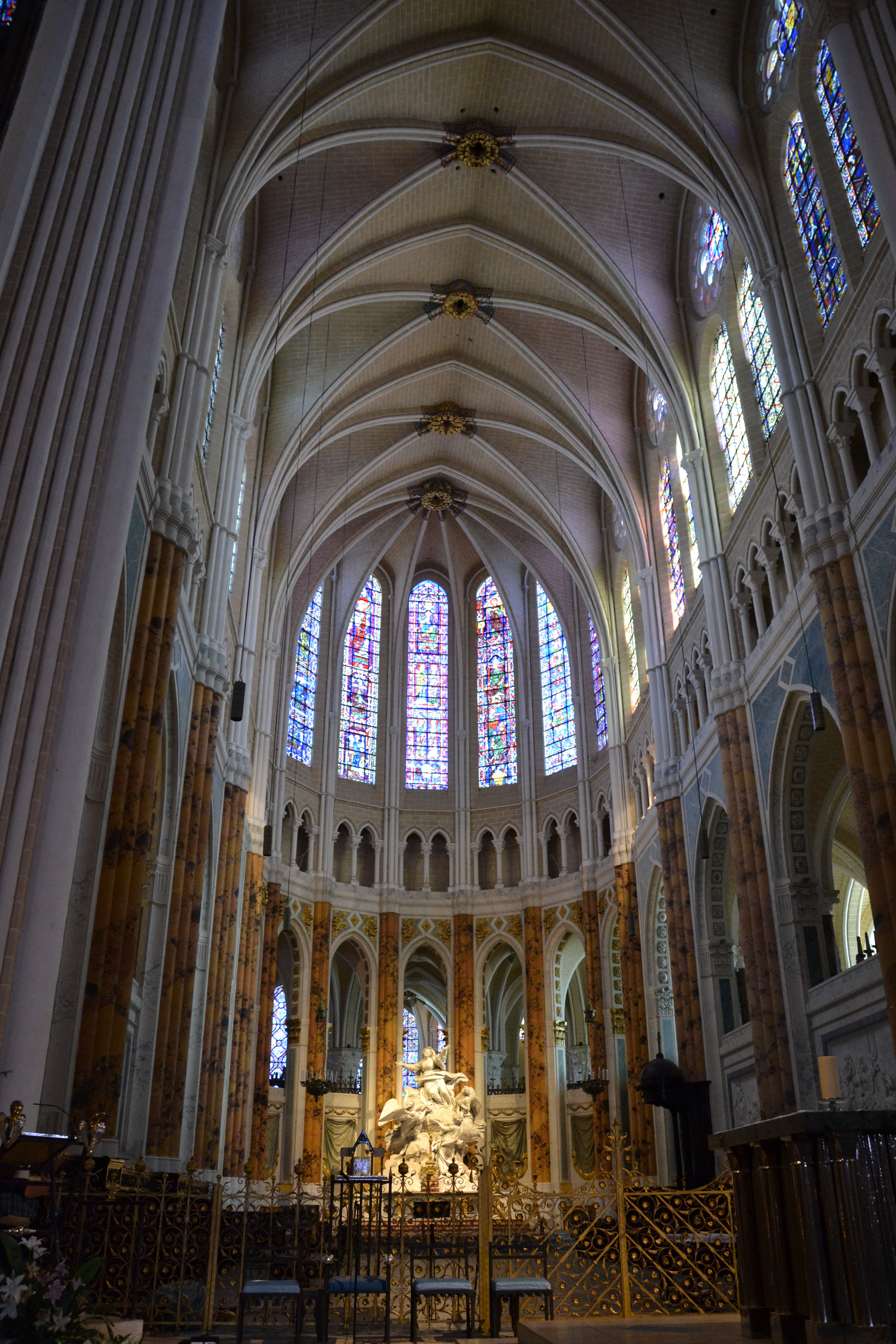
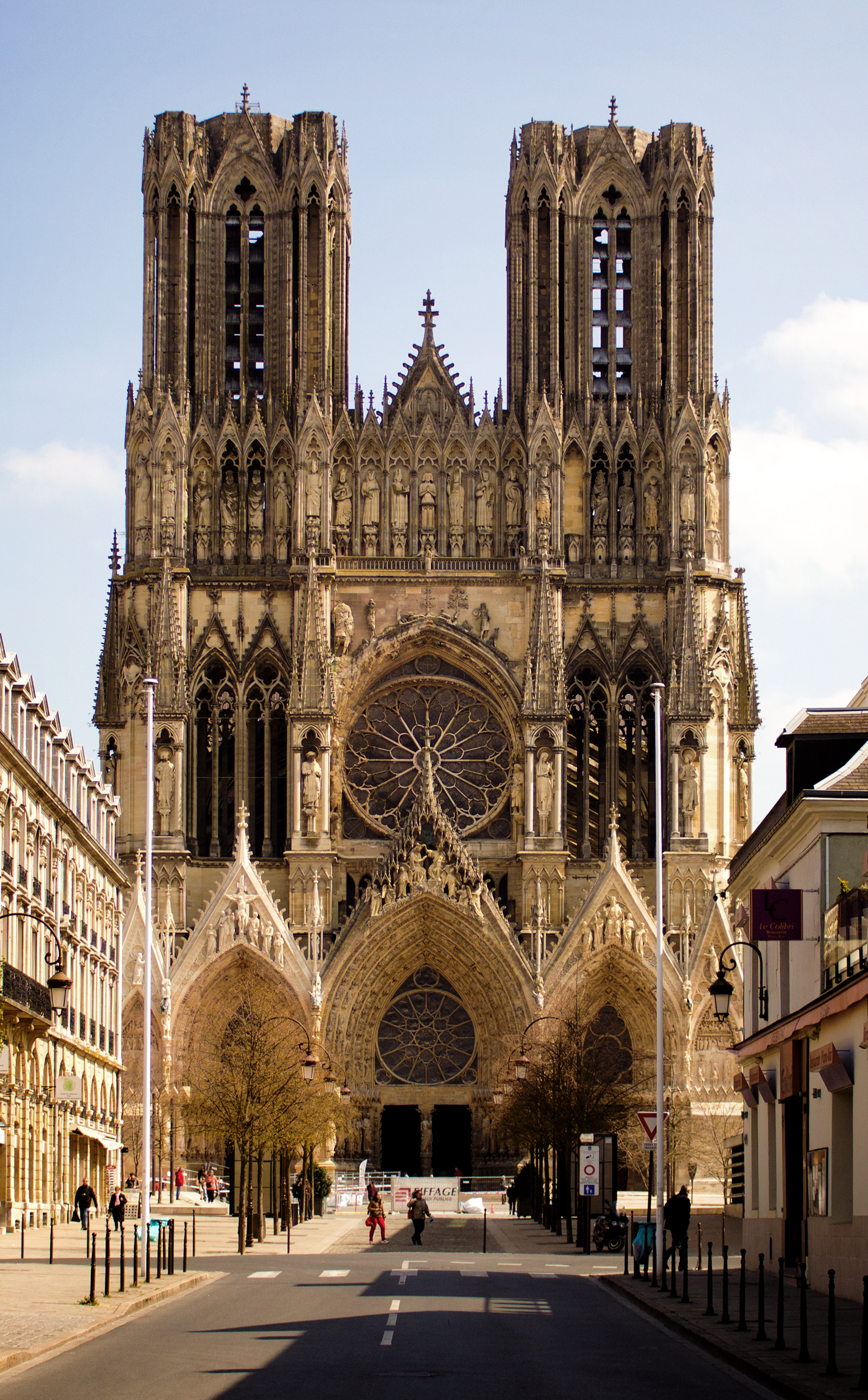
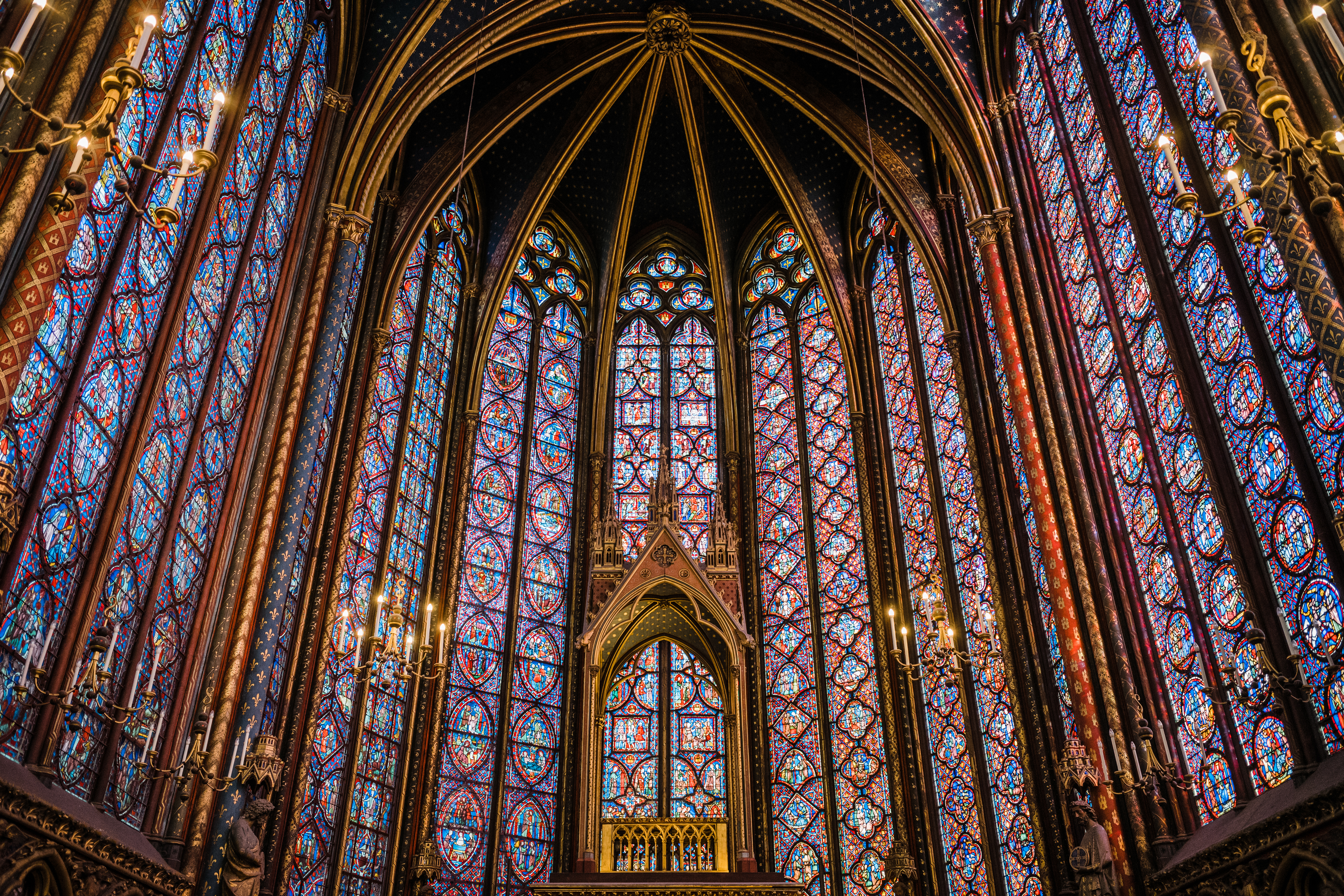
- Top left: Notre-Dame de Paris; top right: rose window, Notre-Dame de Paris; center: overview of Chartres Cathedral: center left: interior of Chartres Cathedral; center right: Reims Cathedral; bottom: Sainte-Chapelle, Paris
- Years active: 1140 to 16th century
- Location: France

French Gothic architecture is an architectural style which emerged in France in 1140, and was dominant until the mid-16th century. The most notable examples are the great Gothic cathedrals of France, including Notre-Dame Cathedral, Reims Cathedral, Chartres Cathedral, and Amiens Cathedral. Its main characteristics are verticality, or height, and the use of the rib vault and flying buttresses and other architectural innovations to distribute the weight of the stone structures to supports on the outside, allowing unprecedented height and volume. The new techniques also permitted the addition of larger windows, which fill the cathedrals with light.

French scholars divide French Gothic into four phases: British and American historians use similar periods.

- Gothique primitif (Primary Gothic) or Gothique premier (First Gothic), from short before 1140 until shortly after 1180, marked by tribunes above the aisles of basilicas. The British and American term for the period is Early Gothic.
- Gothique Classique or (Classic Gothic), from the 1180s to the first third of 13th century, marked by basilicas without lateral tribunes and with triforia without windows. The British and American term is for the period is High Gothic. and Some buildings of this phase, like Chartres Cathedral, are included by Anglo-American historians in Early Gothic; others, like the Reims Cathedral and the western parts of Amiens Cathedral, are included in High Gothic.
- Gothique rayonnant (Radiating Gothic), from the second third of 13th century to the first half of 14th century, marked by triforia with windows and a general preference for stained glass instead of stone walls. It forms the greater portion of High Gothic. American and British historians also use the term Rayonnant.
- Gothique flamboyant (Flamboyant Gothic), since mid 14th century, marked by sinuous flame-lime (hence the name) forms of tracery. British and American historians use the same term.

French Gothic was influential across the Catholic world, with the notable exception of Italy. It was gradually supplanted as the dominant French style in the mid-16th century by French Renaissance architecture.

== Origins ==
French Gothic architecture was the result of the emergence in the 12th century of a powerful French state centered in the Île-de-France. During the reign of Louis VI of France (1081–1137), Paris was the principal residence of the Kings of France, Reims the place of coronation, and the Abbey of Saint-Denis became their ceremonial burial place. The Abbot of Saint-Denis, Suger, was a counselor of Louis VI and Louis VII, as well as a historian. He oversaw the reconstruction of the ambulatory of Saint-Denis, making it the first and most influential example of Gothic architecture in France. The first complete Gothic cathedral, Sens Cathedral, was finished shortly afterwards.

Over the later course of the Capetian dynasty (1180 to 1328), three Kings: Philip Augustus (1180–1223), Louis IX of France (1226–1270), and Philip le Bel (1285–1314), established France as the major economic and political power on the Continent. The period also saw the founding of the University of Paris or Sorbonne. It produced the High Gothic and the Flamboyant Gothic styles, and the construction of some of the most famous cathedrals, including Chartres Cathedral, Reims Cathedral, and Amiens Cathedral.

== Primary or Early Gothic ==
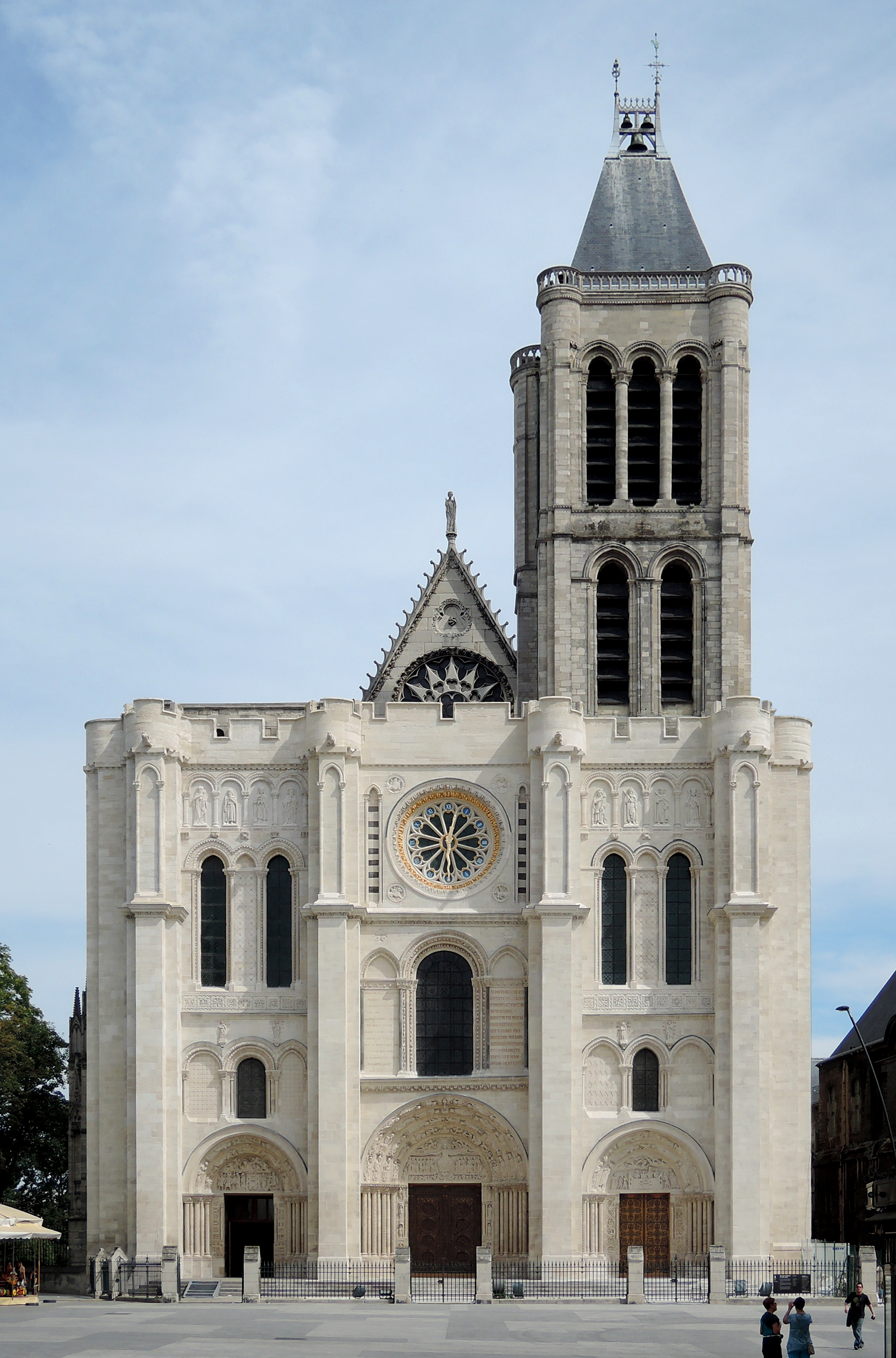
Basilica of Saint Denis, west facade (1130–1140)

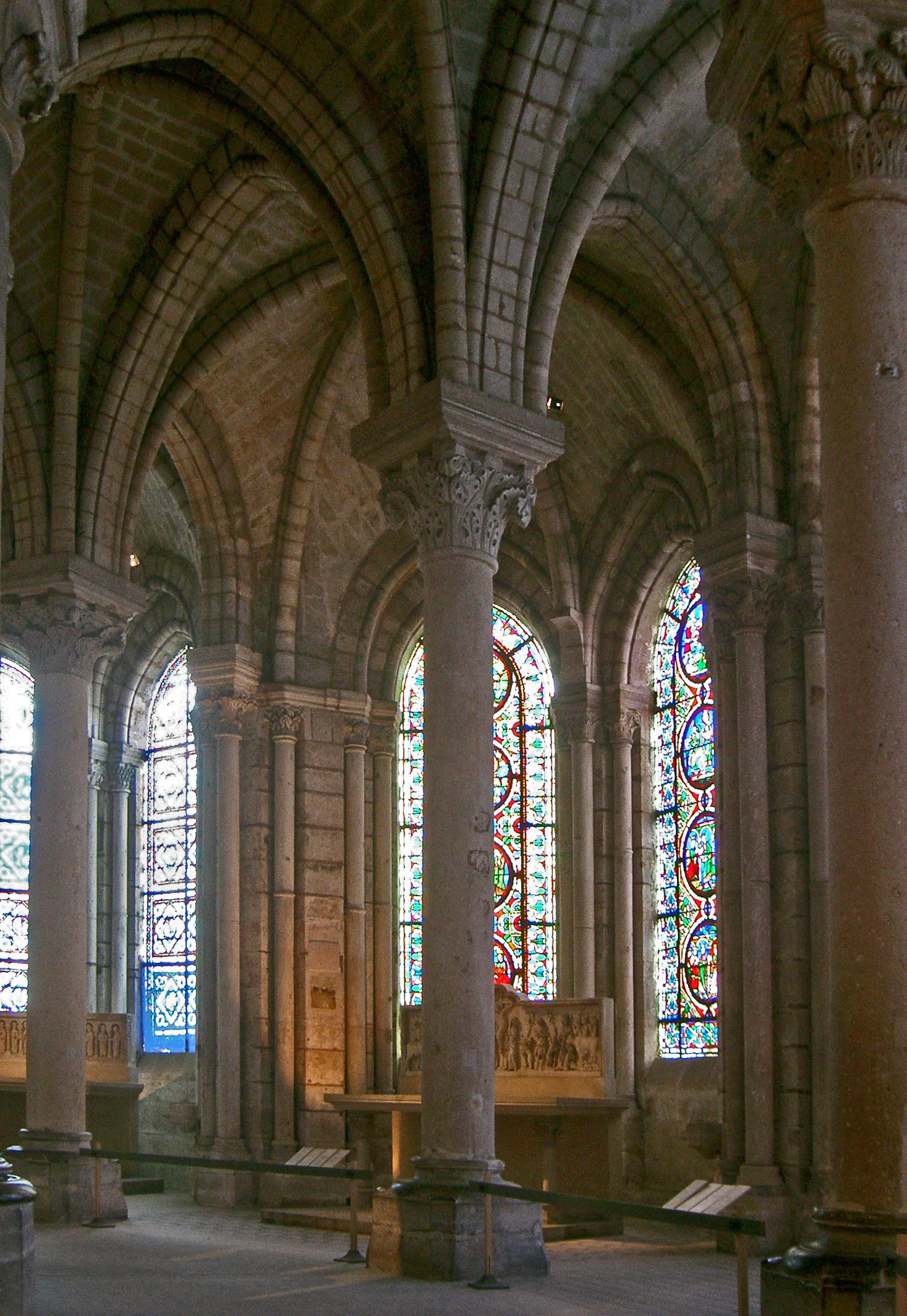
Ambulatory of Basilica of Saint-Denis (c. 1140)

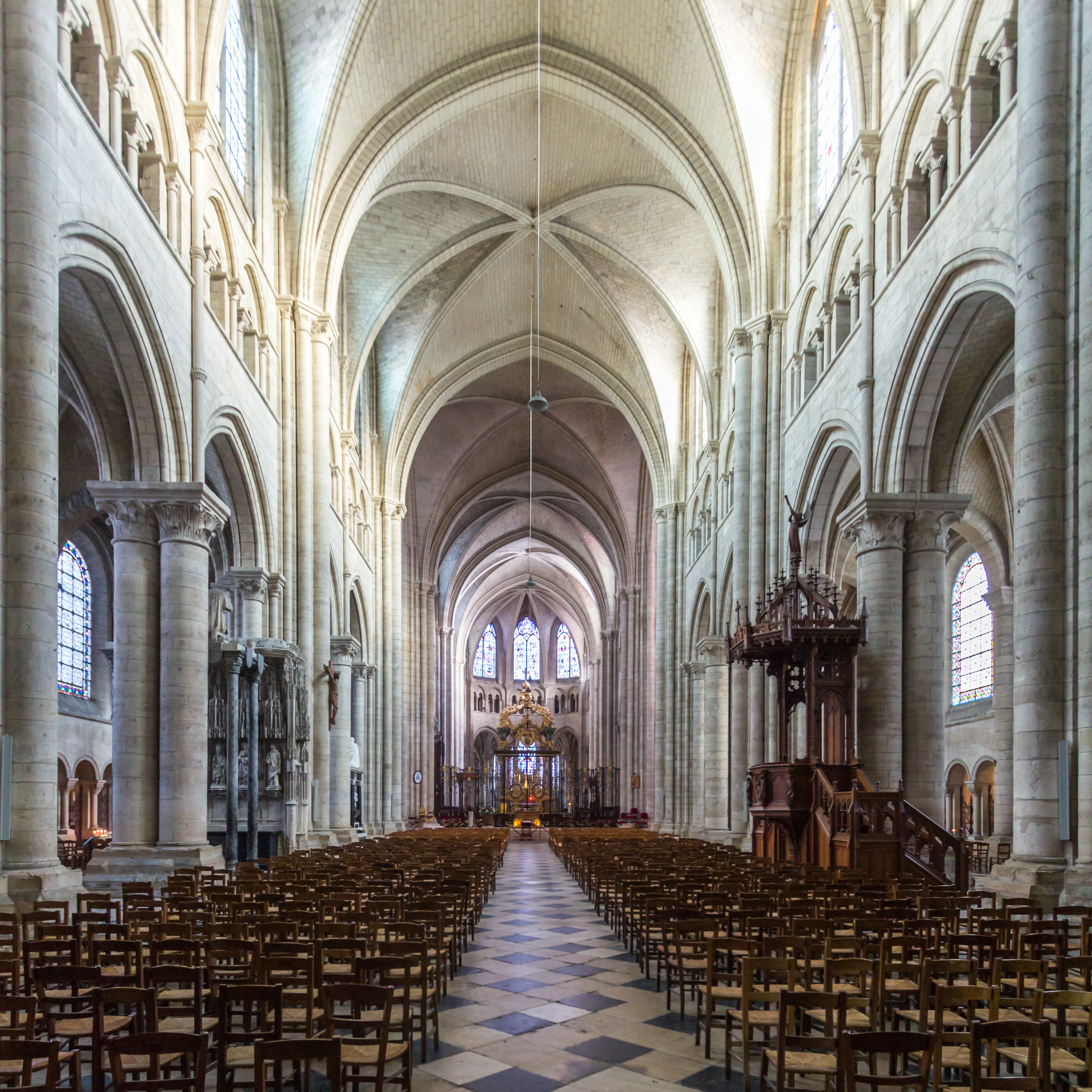
Nave of Sens Cathedral (1140–1164)

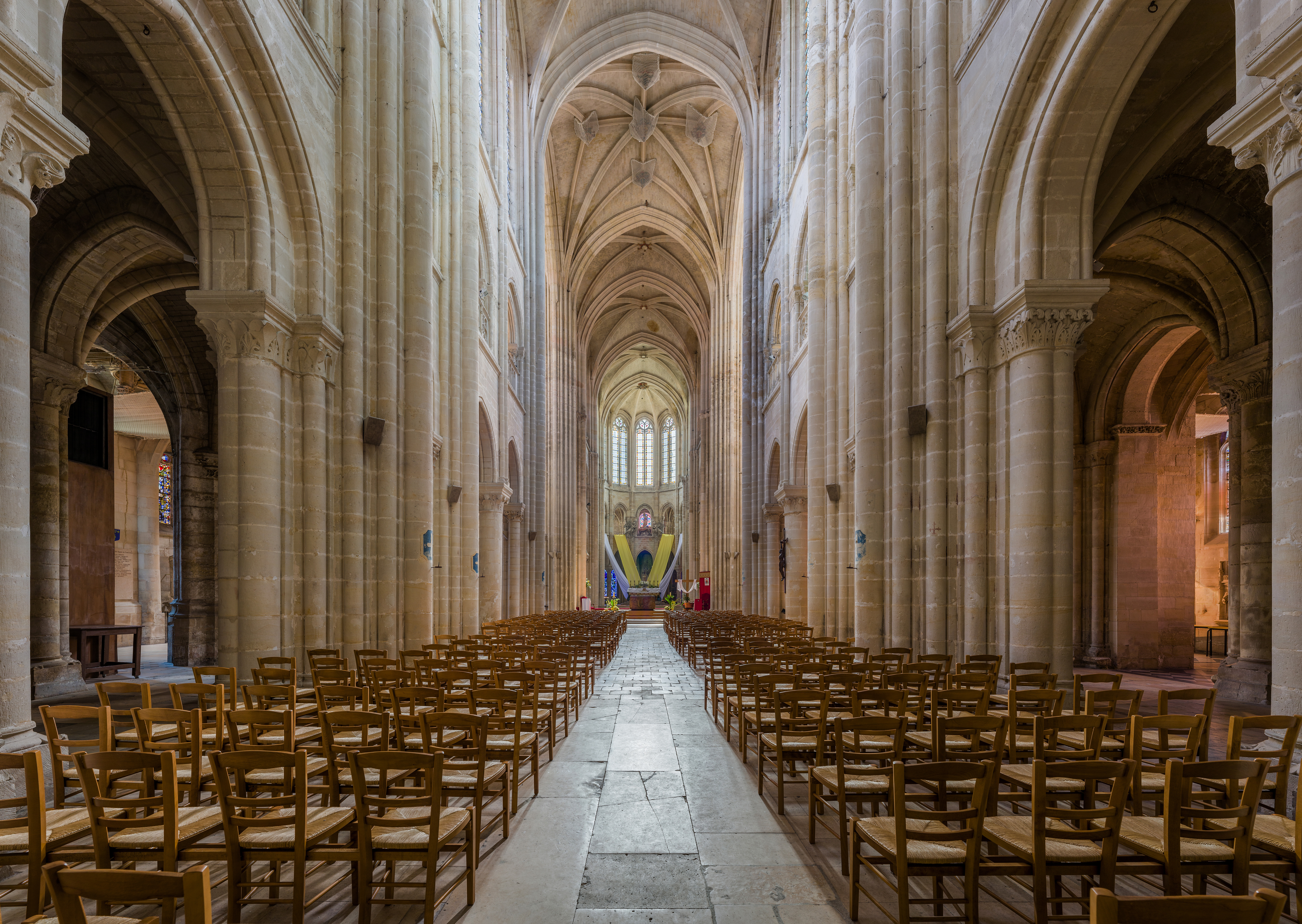
Nave of Senlis Cathedral (1153–1191)

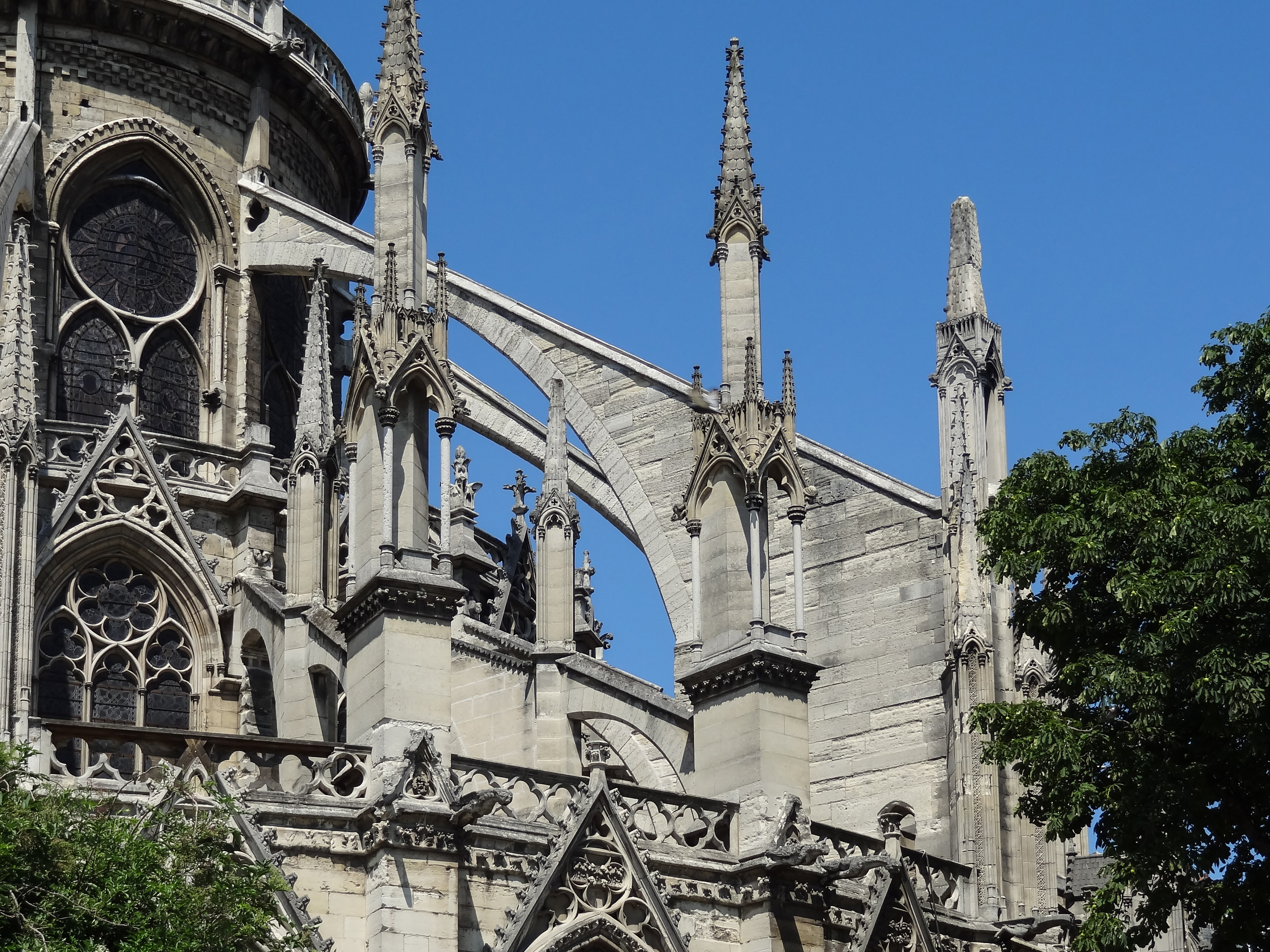
Choir and ambulatory of Notre Dame Cathedral, begun in 1163, were significantly remodeled after a fire in 1220; the triforia demolished allowing for the enlargement of the clerestory, the flying buttresses were rebuilt as new ones, and the file of chapels was added to the ambulatory.

The birthplace of the new style was the Basilica of Saint-Denis in the Île-de-France, not far north of Paris where, in 1137, the Abbé Suger began the reconstruction of the Carolingian-era abbey church. Just to the west of the original church, he began building a new structure with two towers, and then, from 1140 to 1144, he began to reconstruct the old church. Most of his modifications were traditional, but he made one remarkable innovation; he decided to create a new choir at the east end of the building, using the pointed arch and the rib vault in the construction of the choir and the ambulatory with radiating chapels. The use of rib vaults, and buttresses outside supporting the walls, allowed the elimination of the traditional walls between the chapels, and the installation of large stained glass windows. This gave the ambulatory a striking openness, light, and greater height.

The builders then constructed the nave of the church, also using rib vaults. It was constructed in four levels; the arcades on the ground floor whose two rows of columns received the ribs of the ceiling vaults; the tribune above it, a gallery which concealed the massive contreforts or buttresses which pressed against the walls; the triforium, another, narrower gallery; and, just below the ceiling, the claire-voie or clerestorey, where the windows were located. The resulting greater height and light differed dramatically from the heaviness of Romanesque architecture. On the facade of the church, Suger introduced another innovation; he used columns in the form of statues of saints to decorate the portal of the church, adding a new element of verticality to the facade. This idea too was soon copied in new cathedrals. Ninety years later, the upper parts of the choir and the whole nave had to be renewed because of signs of decay; the new upper choir (on the arcades of the Primary Gothic) was built with a triforium with windows. This was the onset of Rayonnant style (see below).

The first cathedral constructed in the new style was Sens Cathedral, begun between 1135 and 1140 and consecrated in 1160. It featured a Gothic choir, and six-part rib vaults over the nave and collateral aisles, alternating pillars and doubled columns to support the vaults, and flying buttresses. But note, much of the ambulatory is still Romanesque, and all adjacent chapels are more recent. One of the builders believed to have worked on that Cathedral, William of Sens, later traveled to England and became the architect who reconstructed the choir of Canterbury Cathedral in the Gothic style. Sens Cathedral was soon followed by Senlis Cathedral (begun 1160), and the most prominent of all, Notre-Dame Cathedral in Paris (begun 1160). Their builders abandoned the traditional plans and introduced the new Gothic elements. The builders of Notre Dame went further by introducing the flying buttress, heavy columns of support outside the walls connected by arches to the walls, which received and counterbalanced the thrust from the rib vaults of the roof. This allowed the builders to construct higher walls and larger windows.

== Classic or High Gothic ==
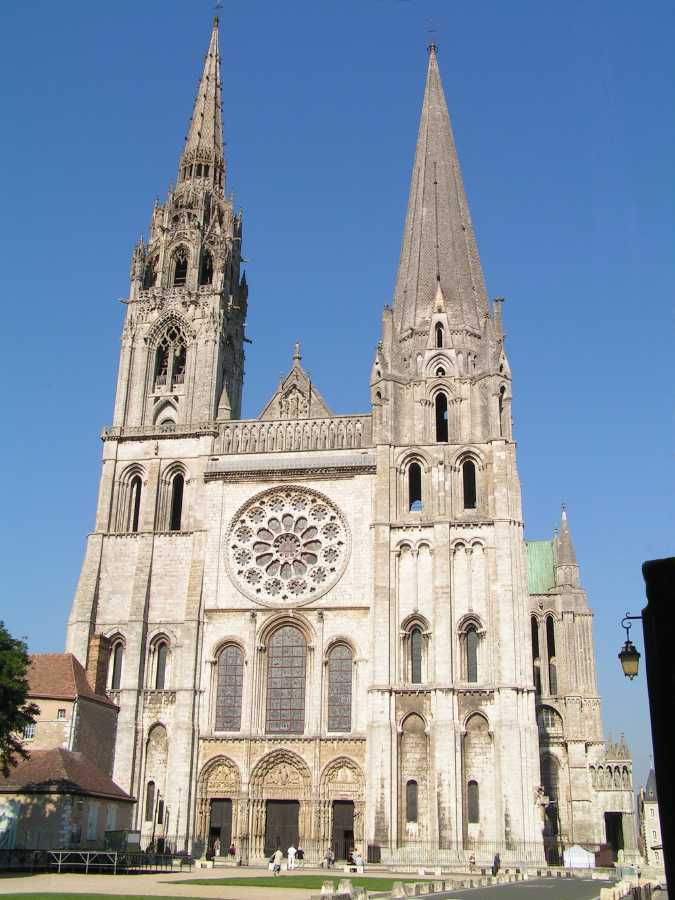
Rose window and facade of Chartres Cathedral (1194–1220). The North spire (on the left) was rebuilt in Flamboyant style from 1507 to 1513.

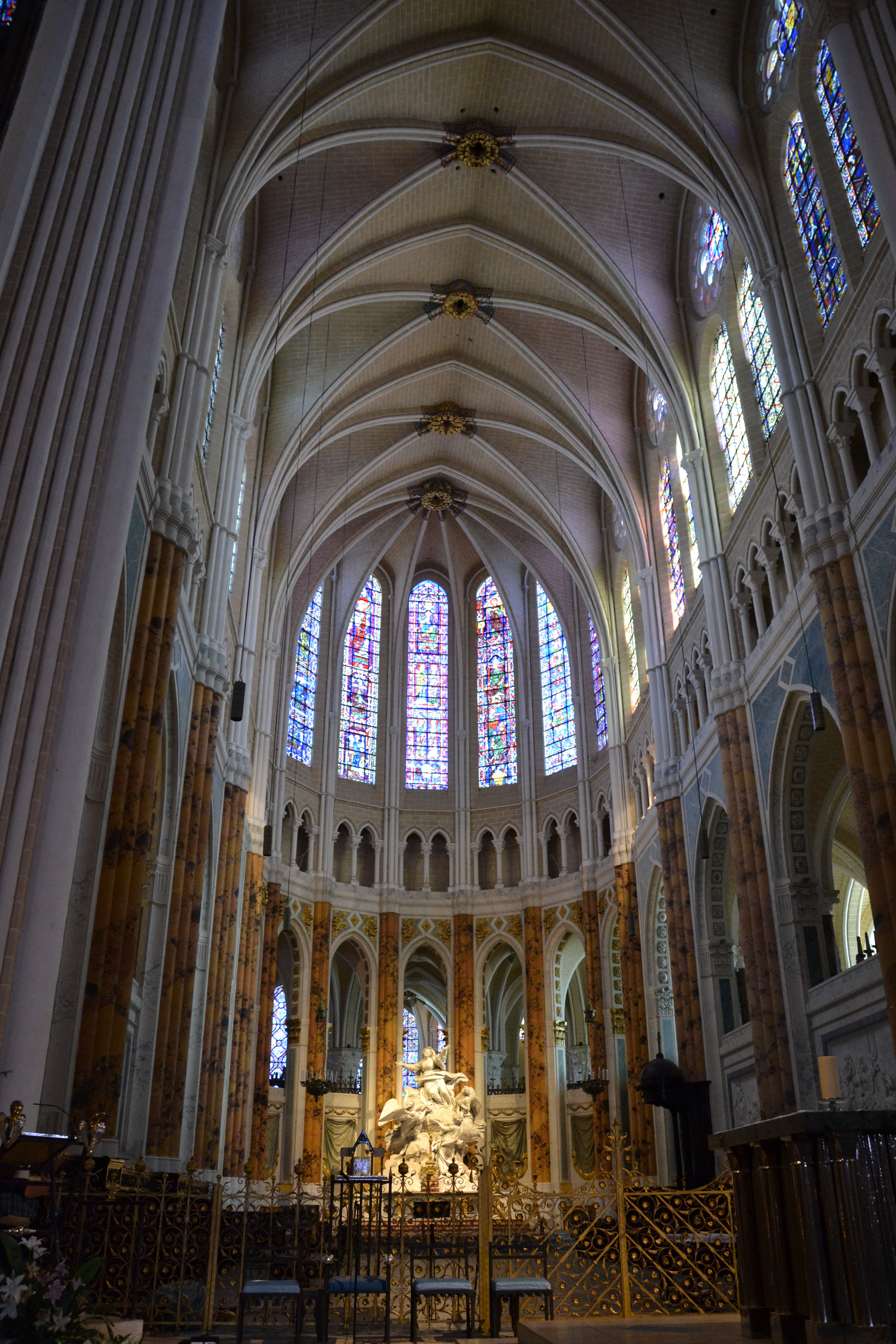
Choir of Chartres Cathedral

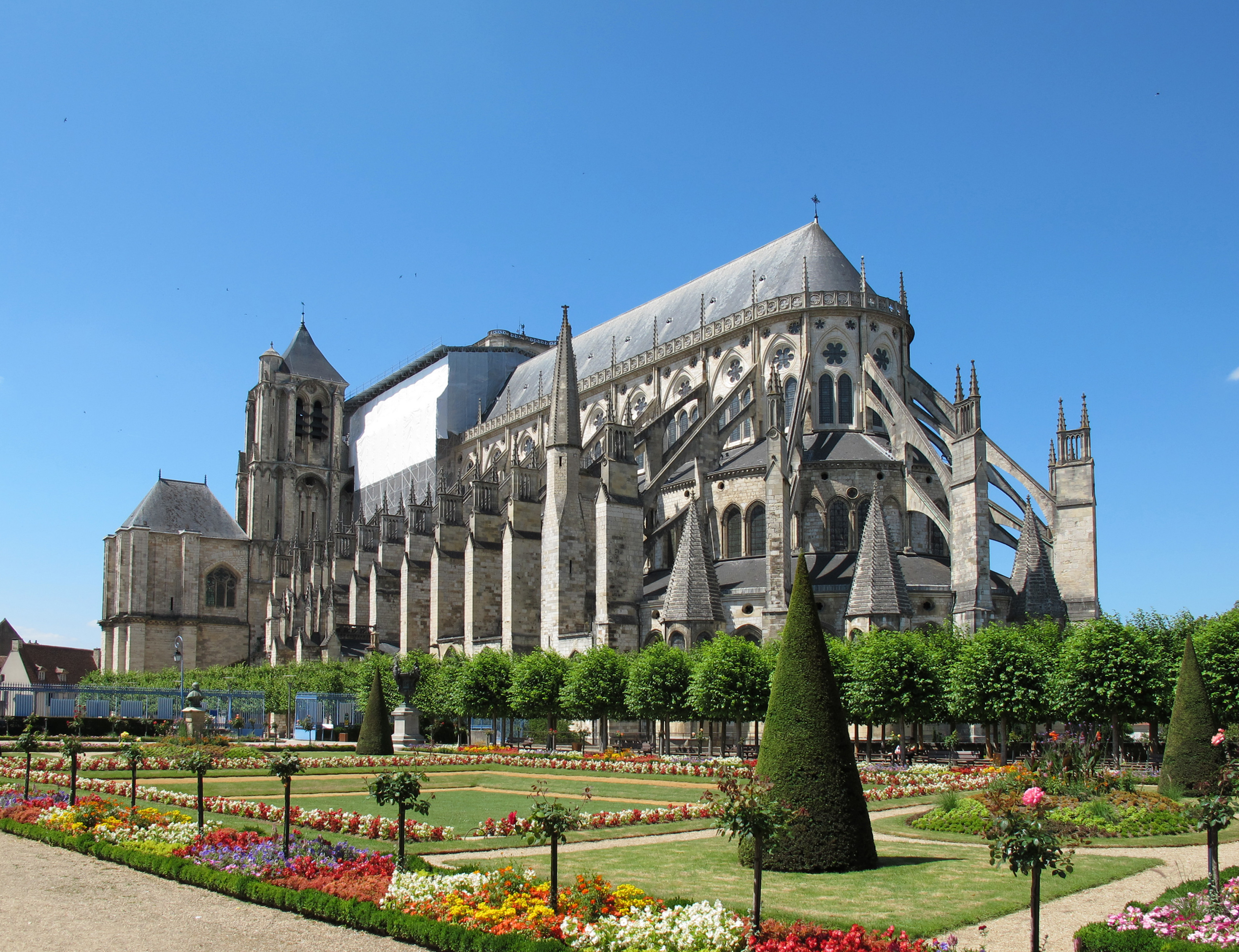
Bourges Cathedral with flying buttresses (1195–1230)

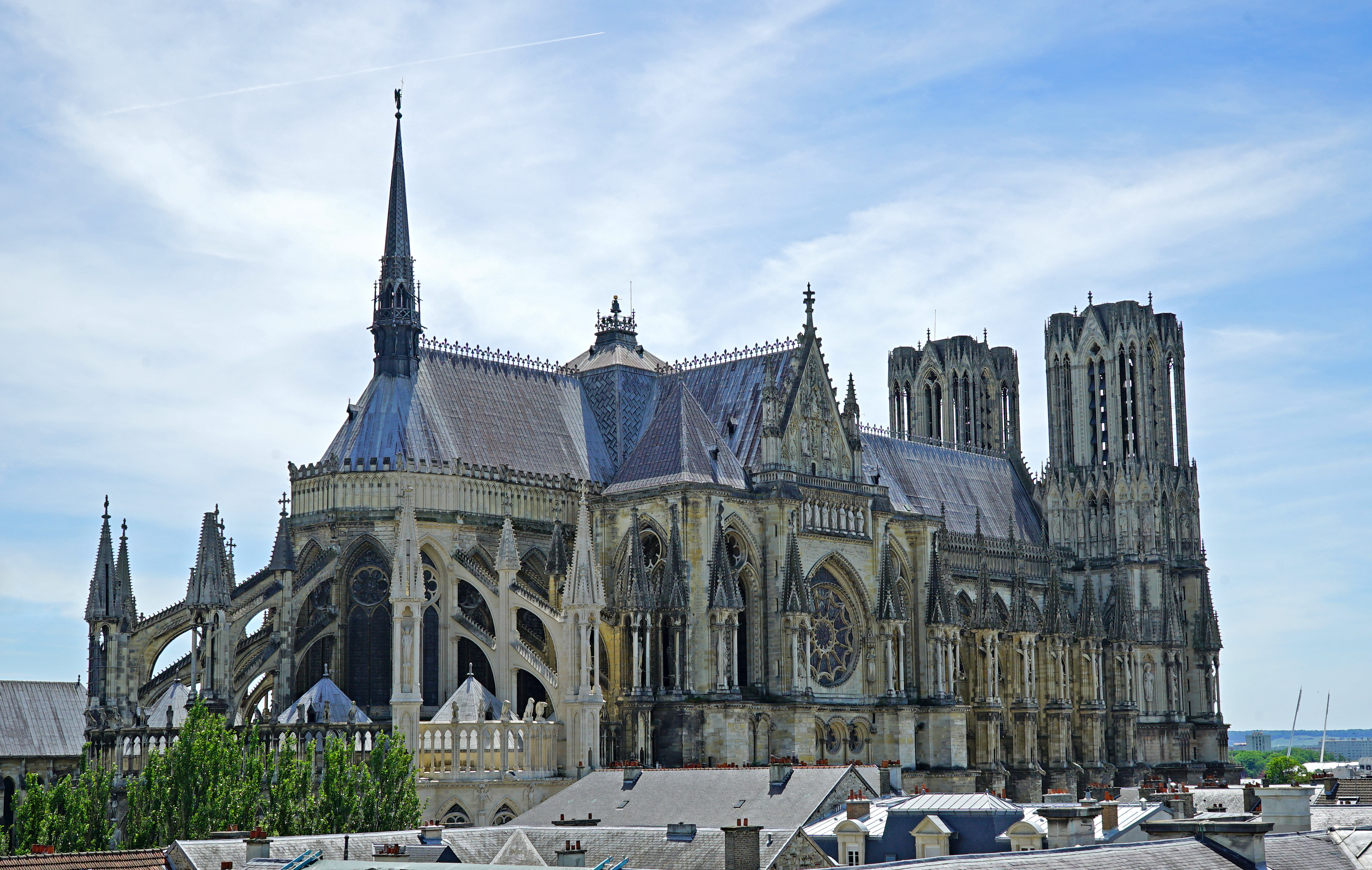
Reims Cathedral from the northwest (1211–1345)

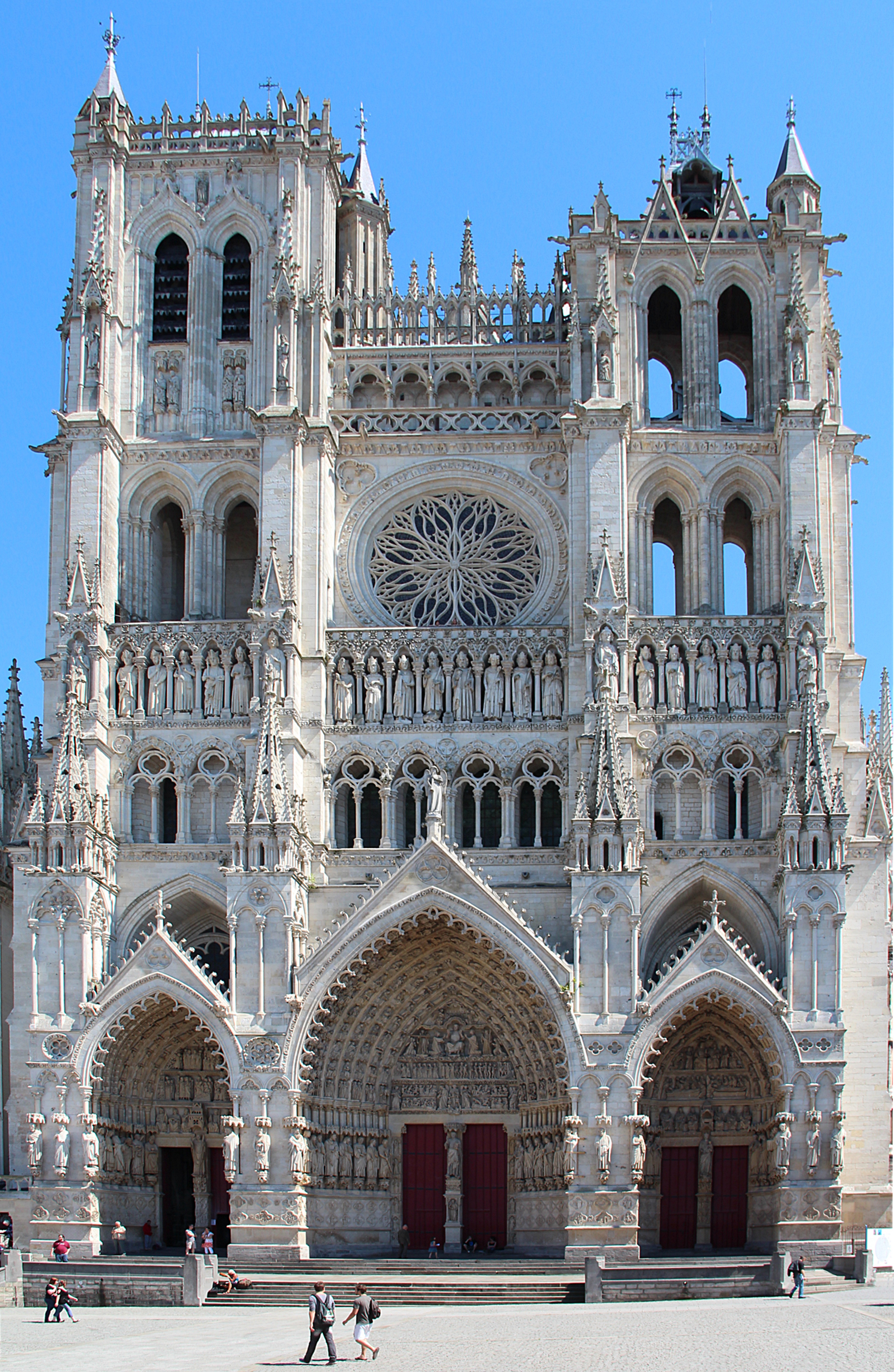
Facade of Amiens Cathedral (1220–1266)

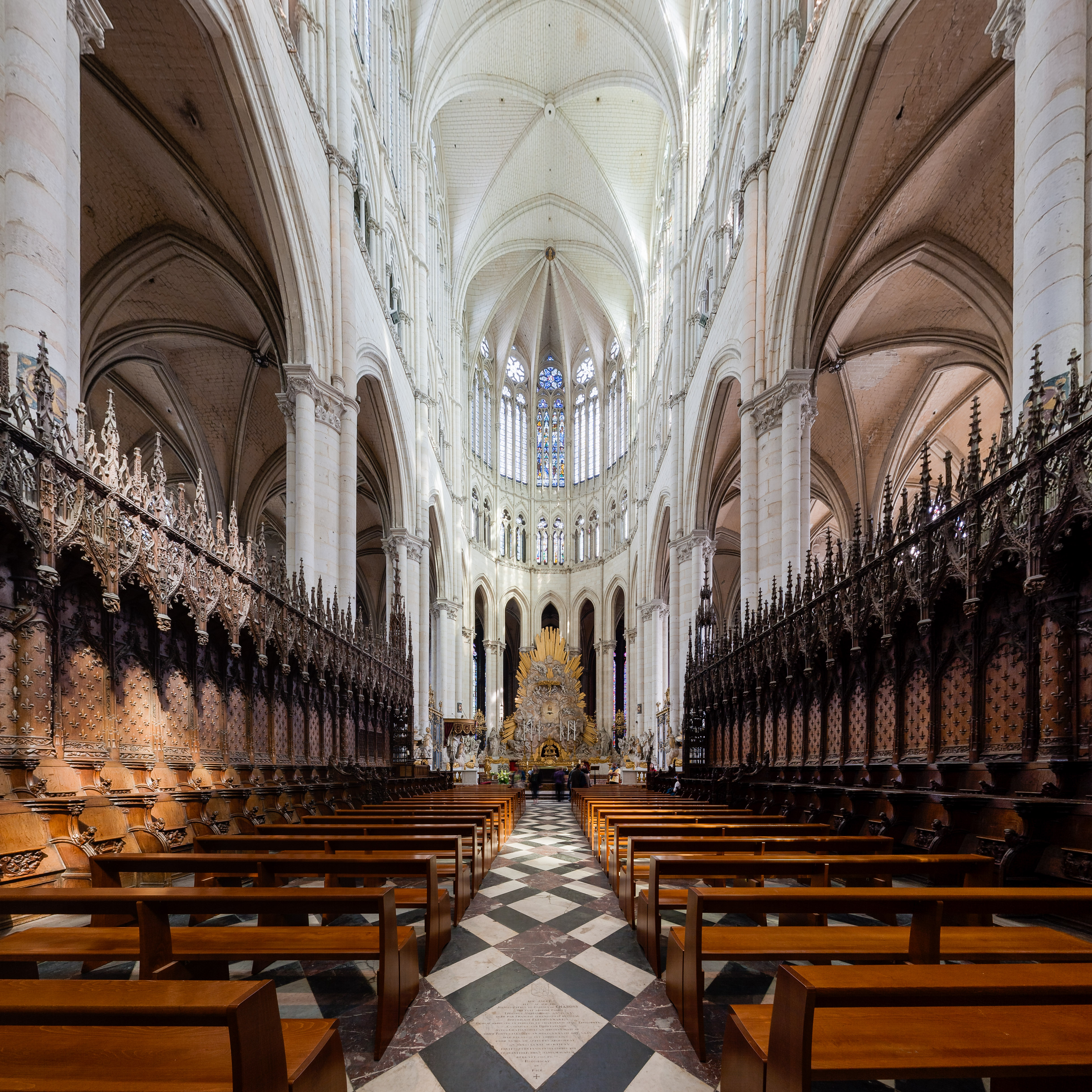
Amiens Cathedral choir and altar

The second phase of Gothic in France is called Gothique Classique or Classic Gothic. The similar phase in English is called High Gothic. From the end of the 12th century until the middle of the 13th century, the Gothic style spread from the cathedrals in Île-de-France to appear in other cities of northern France, notably Chartres Cathedral (begun 1200); Bourges Cathedral (1195 to 1230), Reims Cathedral (1211–1275), and Amiens Cathedral (begun 1250); The characteristic Gothic elements were refined to make the new cathedrals taller, wider, and more full of light. At Chartres, the use of the flying buttresses allowed the elimination of the tribune level, which allowed much higher arcades and nave, and larger windows. The pillars were made of a central column surrounded by four more slender columns, which reached up to support the arches of the vaulted ceiling. The rib vault changed from six to four ribs, simpler and stronger. The flying buttresses at Amiens and Chartes were strengthened by an additional arch and with a supporting arcade, allowing even higher walls and more windows. At Reims, the buttresses were given greater weight and strength by the addition of heavy stone pinnacles on top. These were often decorated with statues of angels, and became an important decorative element of the High Gothic style. Another practical and decorative element, the gargoyle, appeared; it was an ornamental rain spout that channeled the water from the roof away from the building. At Amiens, the windows of the nave were made larger, and an additional row of clear glass windows (the claire-voie) flooded the interior with light. The new structural technologies allowed the enlargement of the transepts and the choirs at the east end of the cathedrals, creating the space for a ring of well-lit chapels.

== Rayonnant Gothic ==
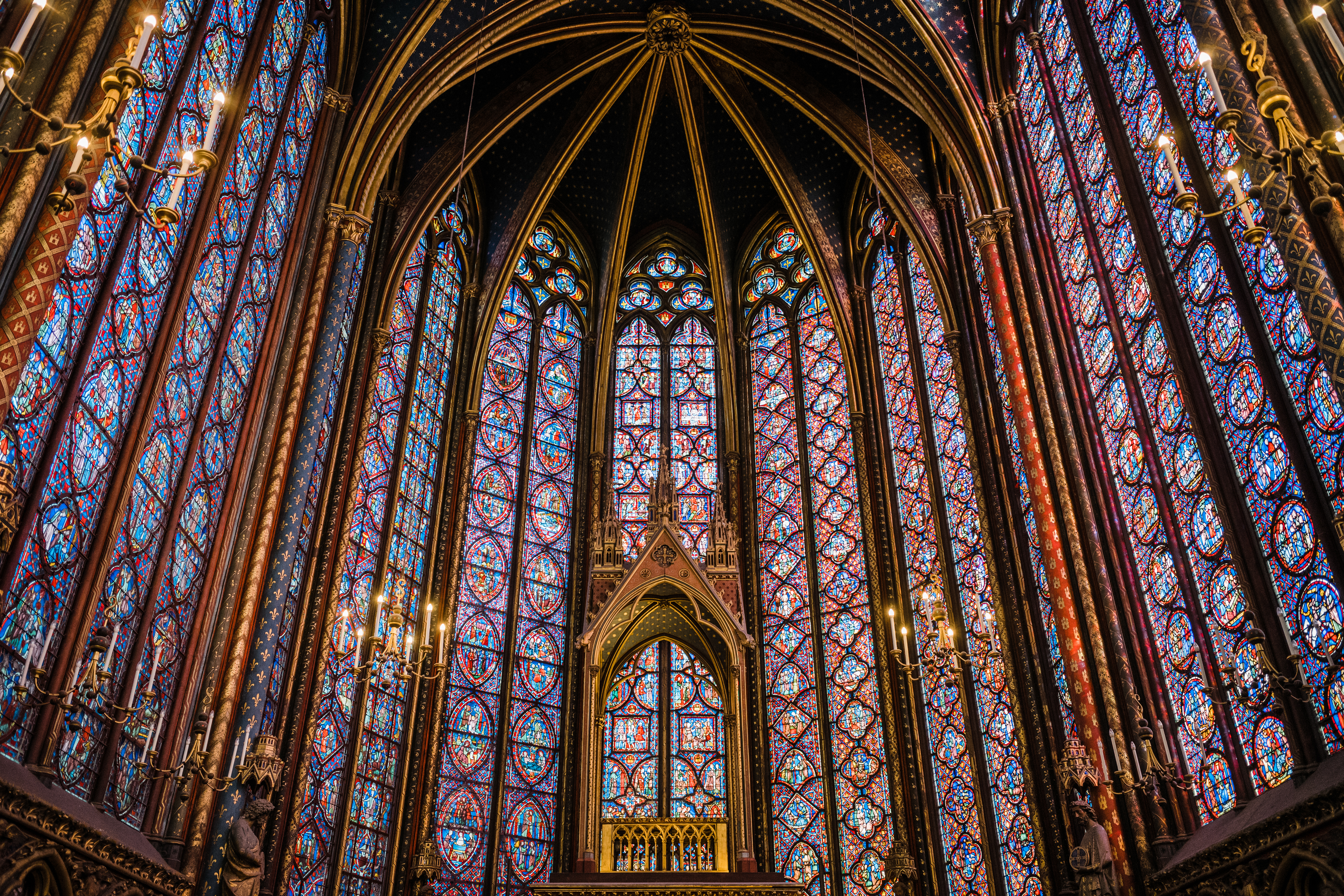
Windows of upper chapel of Sainte-Chapelle (1238–1248)

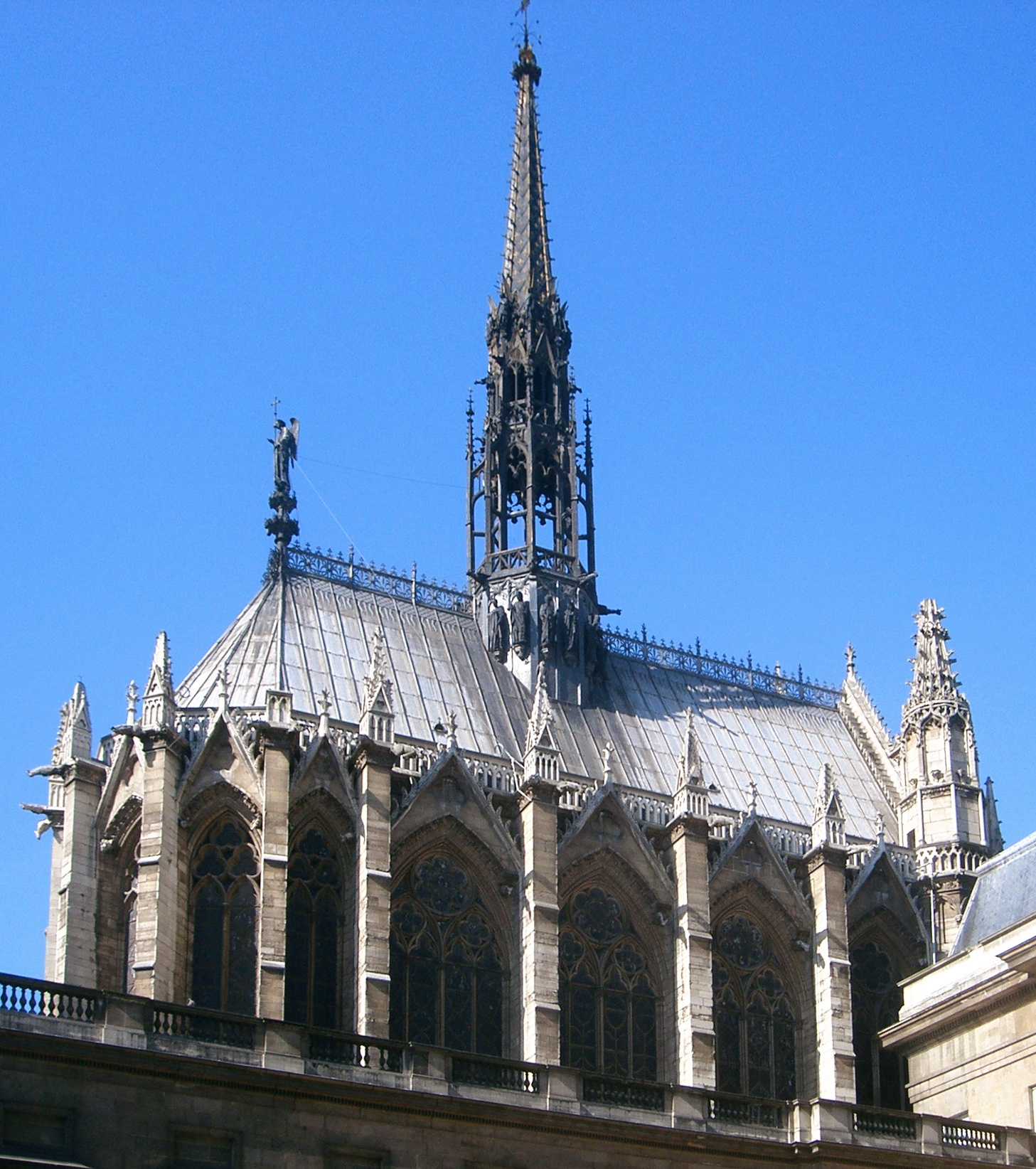
Columns of exterior framework supporting the windows of Sainte-Chapelle

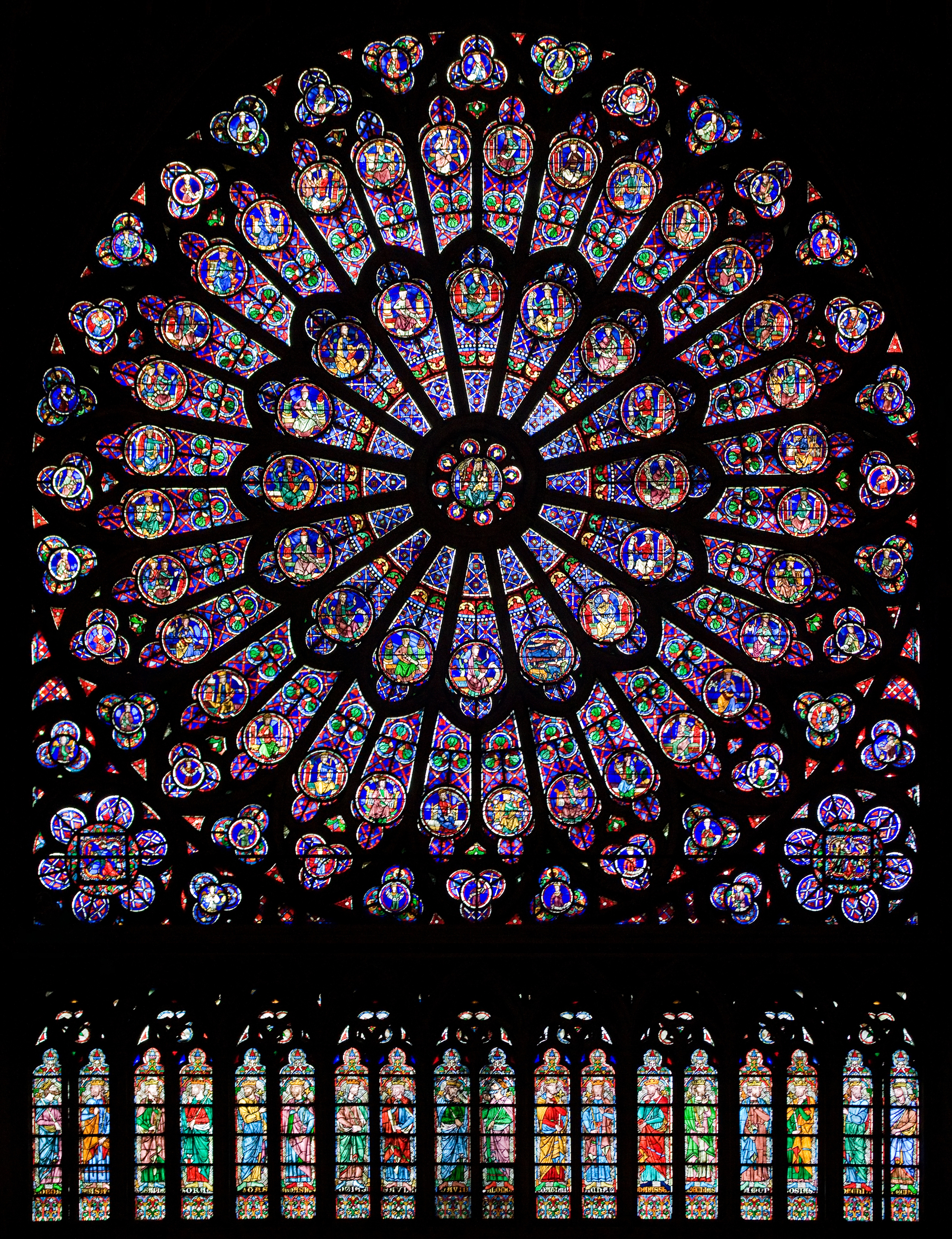
Rose window in north transept of Notre Dame Cathedral

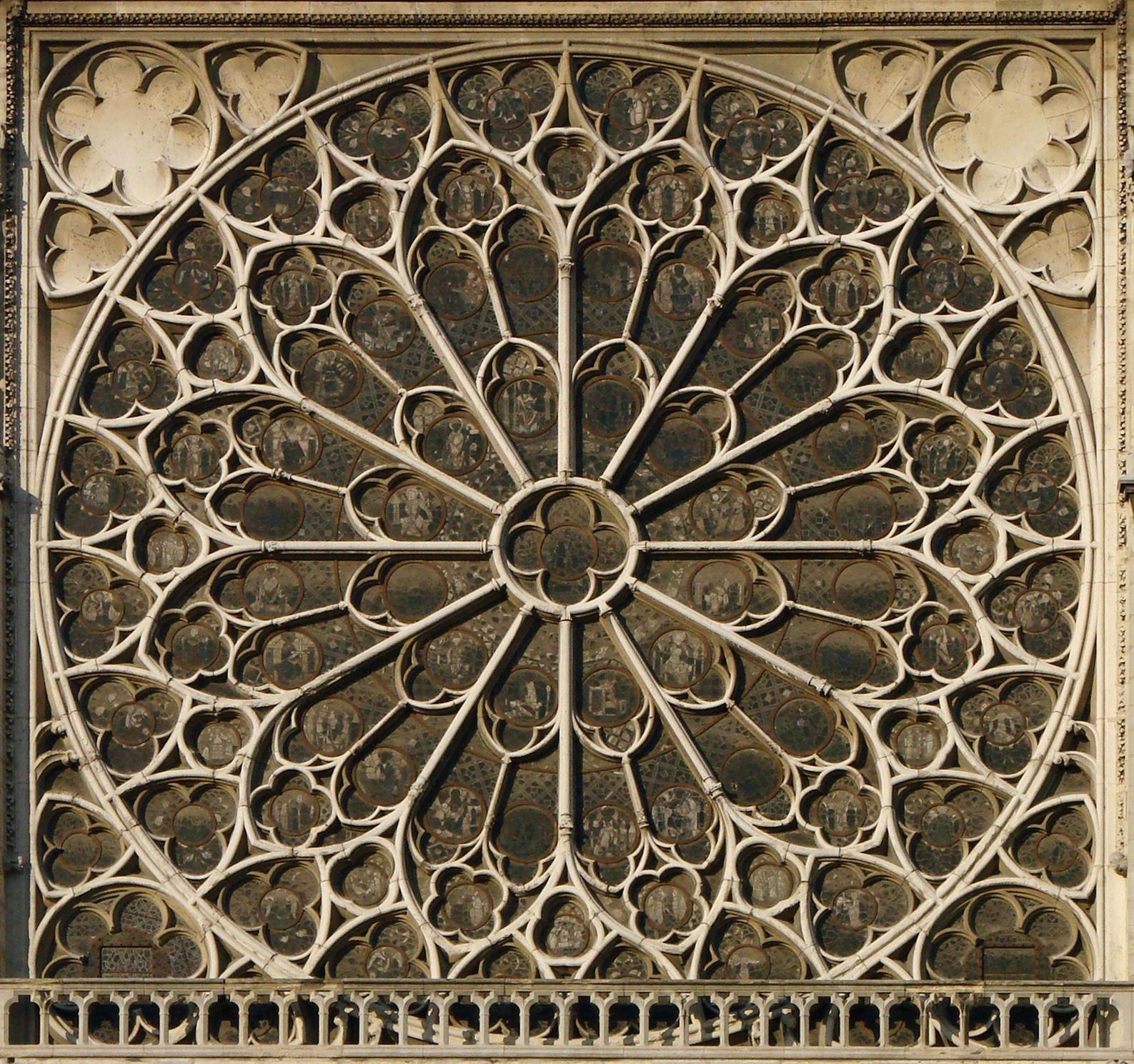
Exterior of south rose window of Notre Dame Cathedral

The third period of French Gothic architecture, from the second half of the 13th century until the 1370s, is termed Rayonnant ("Radiant") in both French and English, describing the radiating pattern of the tracery in the stained glass windows, and also describing the tendency toward the use of more and more stained glass and less masonry in the design of the structure, until the walls seemed entirely made of glass. The most celebrated example was the chapel of Sainte-Chapelle, attached to the royal residence on the Palais de la Cité. An elaborate system of exterior columns and arches reduced the walls of the upper chapel to a thin framework for the enormous windows. The weight of each of the masonry gables above the archivolt of the windows also helped the walls to resist the thrust and to distribute the weight.

Other landmarks of the Rayonnant Gothic are the two rose windows on the north and south of the transept of Notre-Dame Cathedral, whereas earlier rose windows, like those of Amiens Cathedral, were framed by stone and occupied only a portion of the wall, these two windows, with a delicate lacelike framework, occupied the entire space between the pillars.

== Flamboyant Gothic ==
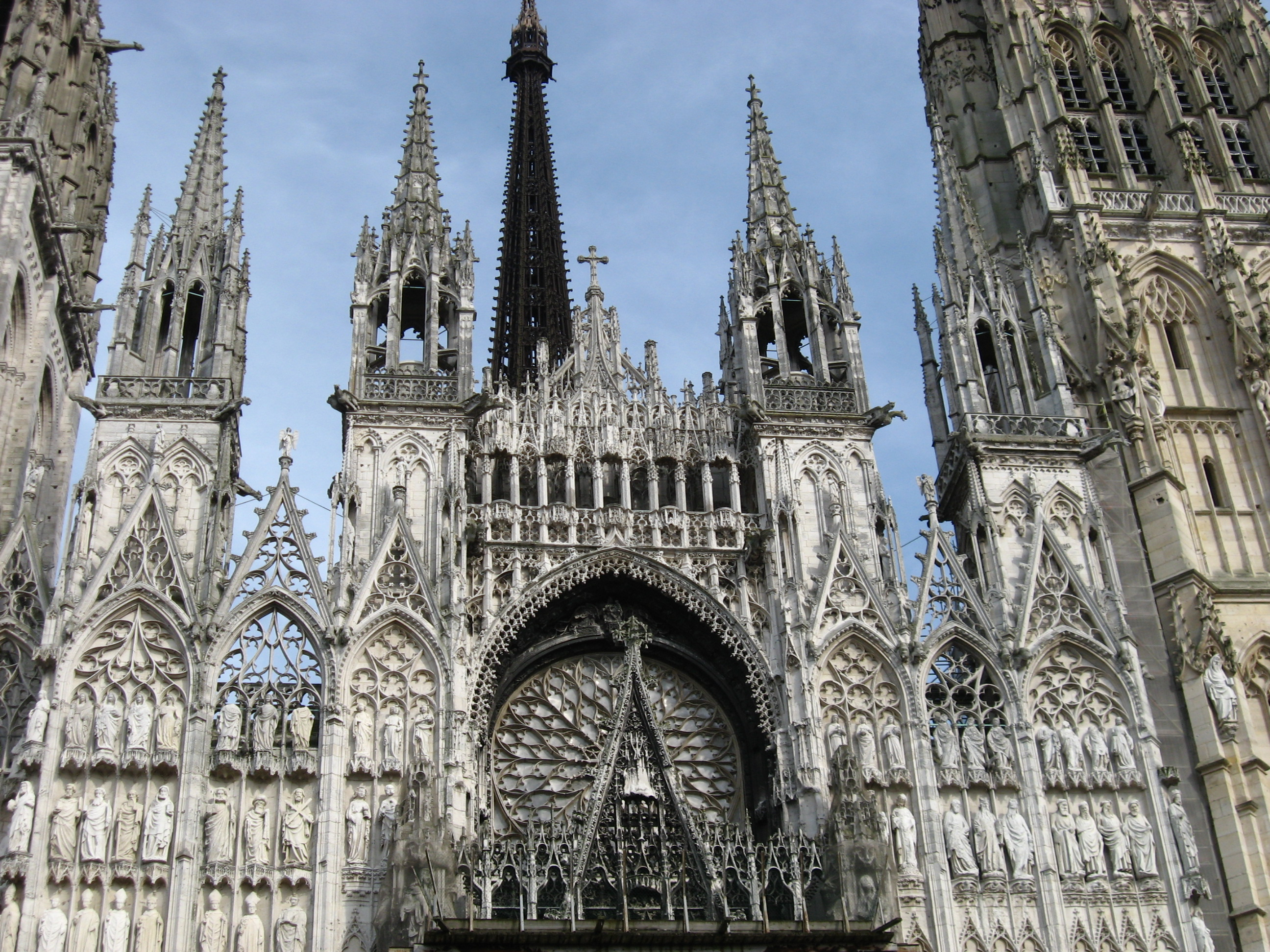
West facade, Rouen Cathedral (1370s)

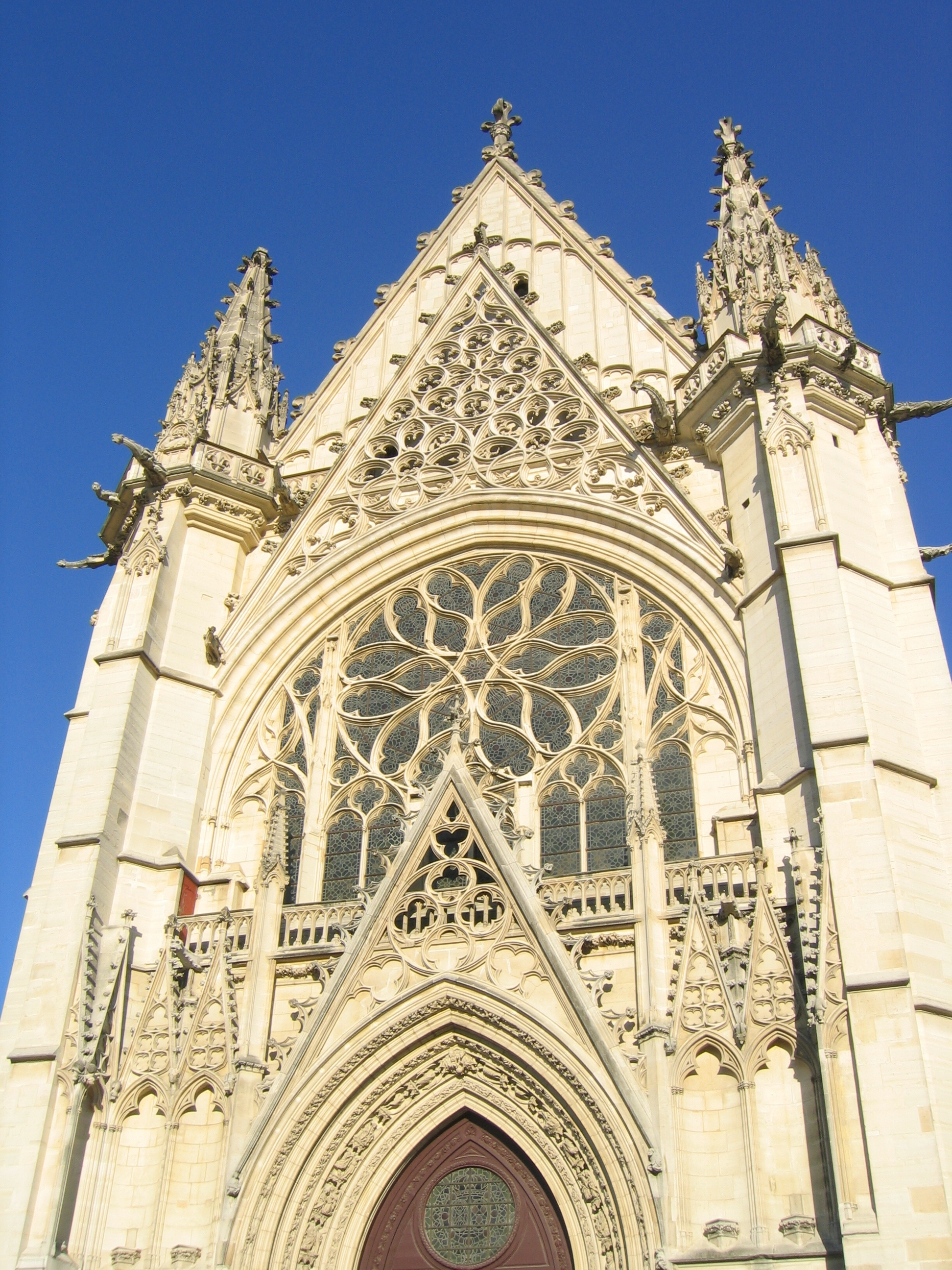
The west front of Sainte-Chapelle de Vincennes (1370s)

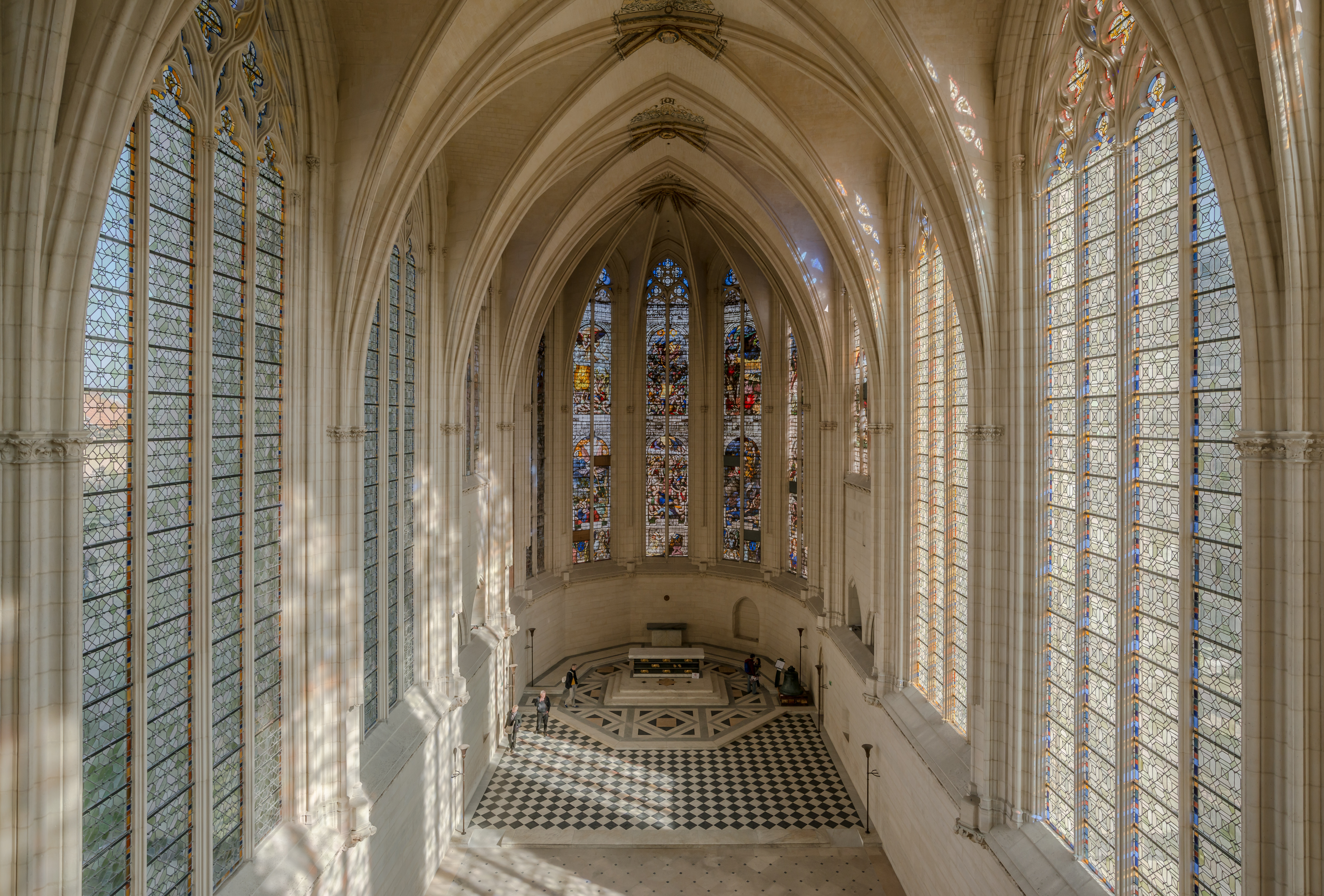
The nave of Sainte-Chapelle de Vincennes

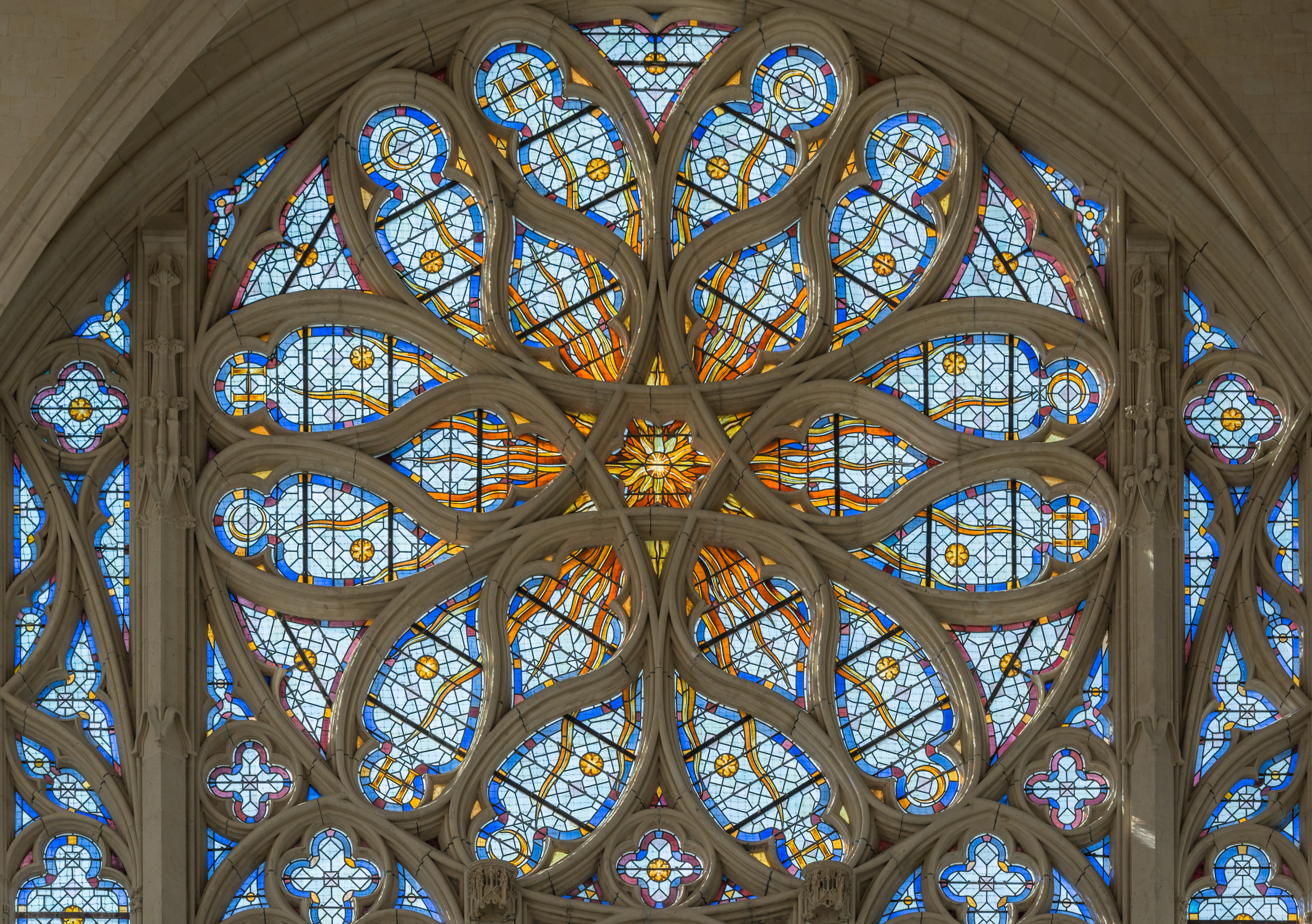
The rose window of Sainte-Chapelle de Vincennes. The sinuous lines of the window frame gave the style the name "Flamboyant".

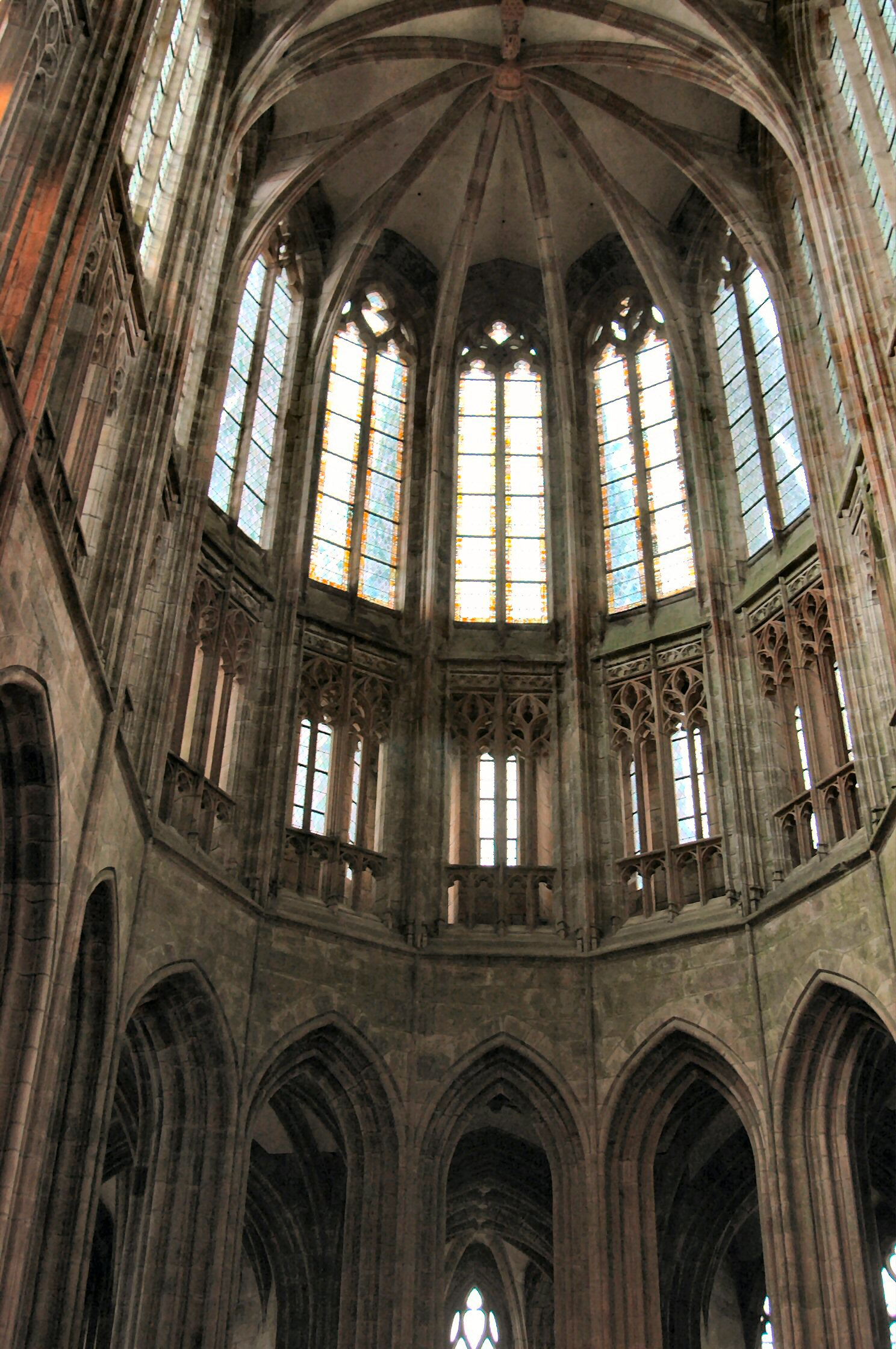
Choir of Mont Saint Michel Abbey (about 1448)

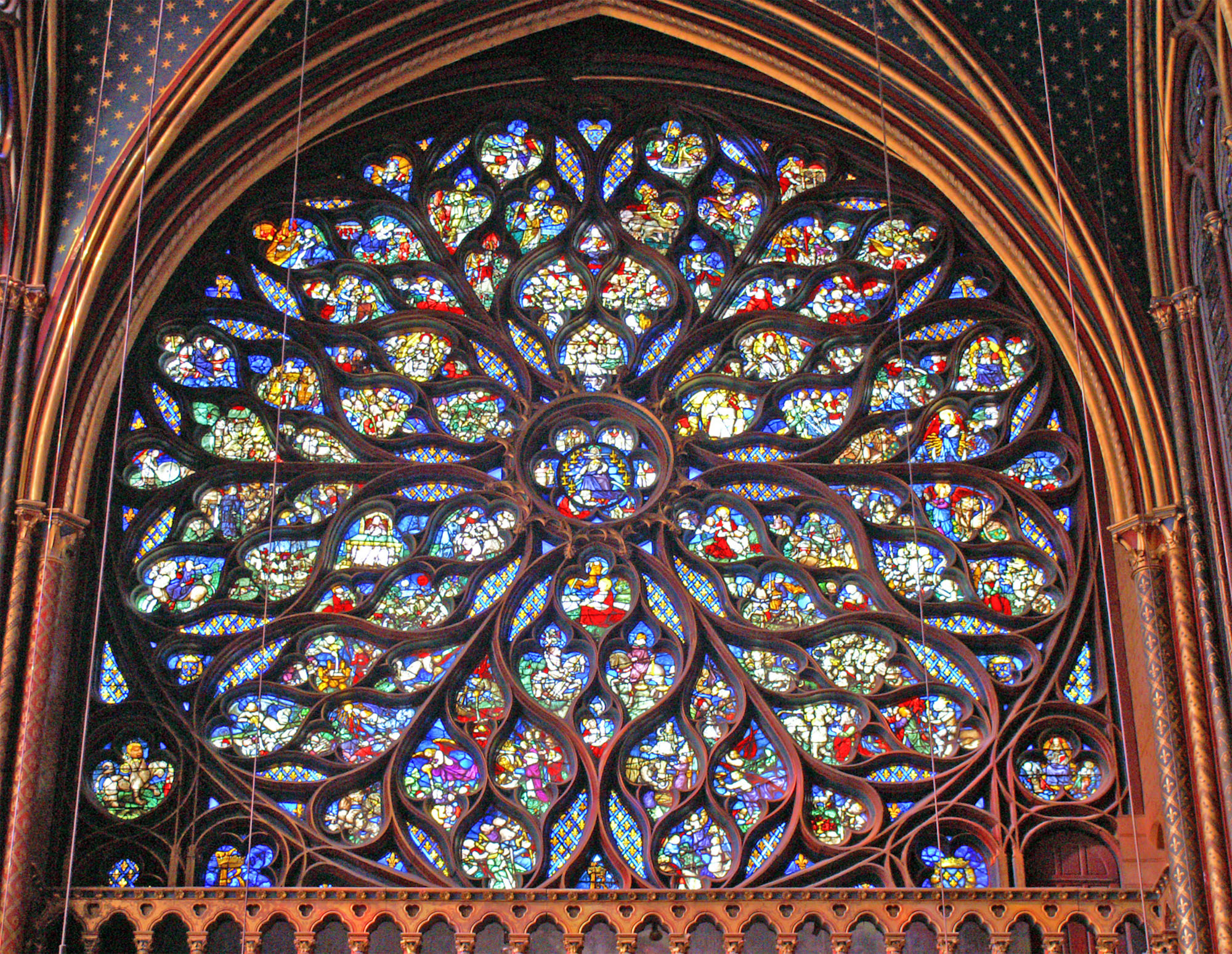
Rose window depicting the Apocalypse in Sainte-Chapelle, Paris. It replaced an earlier rose of the same theme.

The Flamboyant Gothic style appeared beginning about 1350 and lasted until about 1500. Its characteristic features were more exuberant decoration, as the nobles and wealthy citizens of mostly northern French cities competed to build more and more elaborate churches and cathedrals. It took its name from the sinuous, flame-like designs which ornamented windows. Other new features included the arc en accolade, a window decorated with an arch, stone pinnacles and floral sculpture. It also featured an increase in the number of nervures, or ribs, that supported and decorated each vault of the ceiling, both for greater support and decorative effect. Notable examples of Flamboyant Gothic include the western facade of Rouen Cathedral and the Sainte-Chapelle de Vincennes, both built in the 1370s; the Choir of Mont Saint Michel Abbey (about 1448), and the 15th-century rose window in the Sainte-Chapelle of Paris.

== Regional forms of French Gothic ==
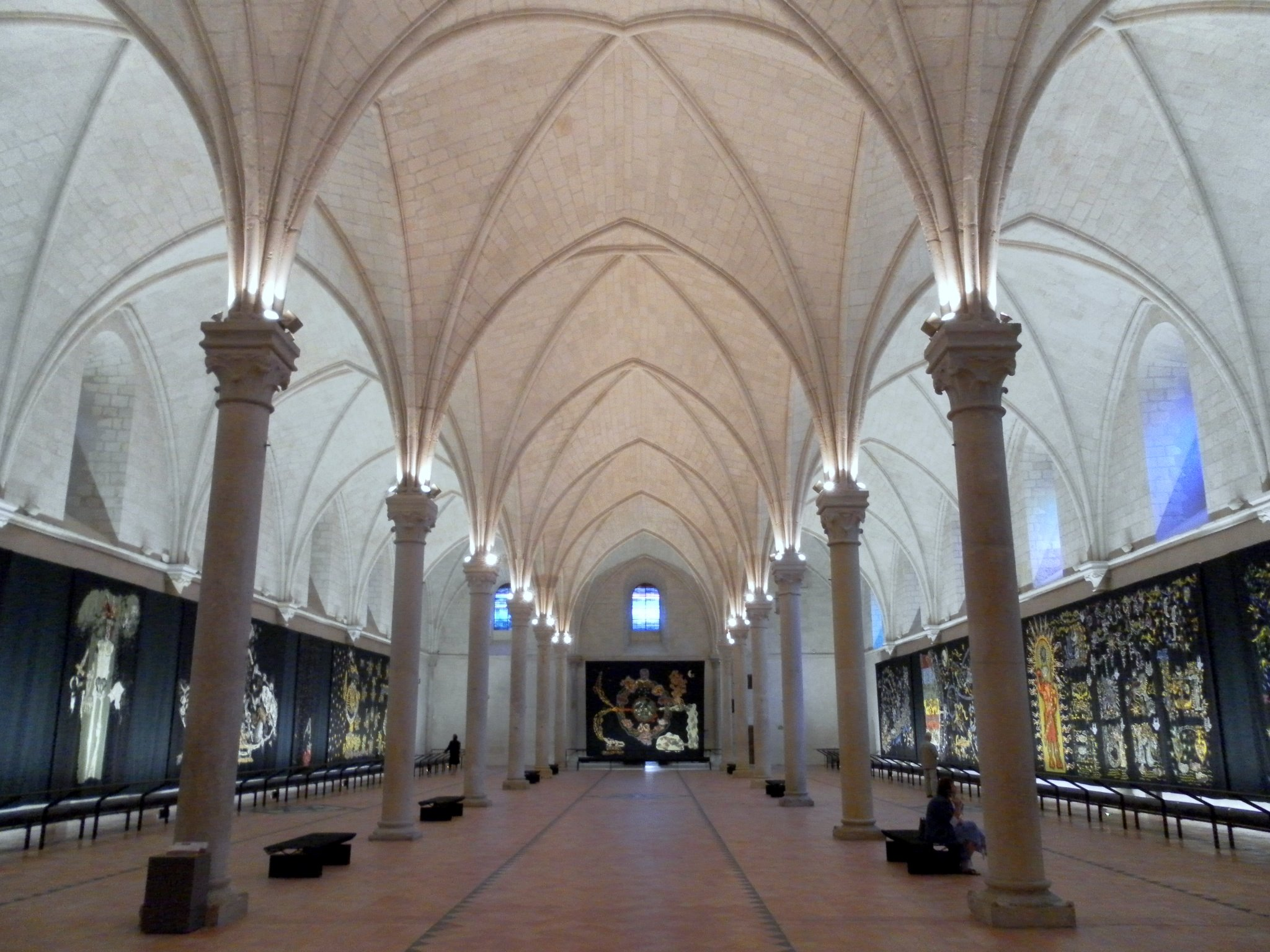
Angevin Gothic vaults and columns in the Hopital-St-Jean in Angers

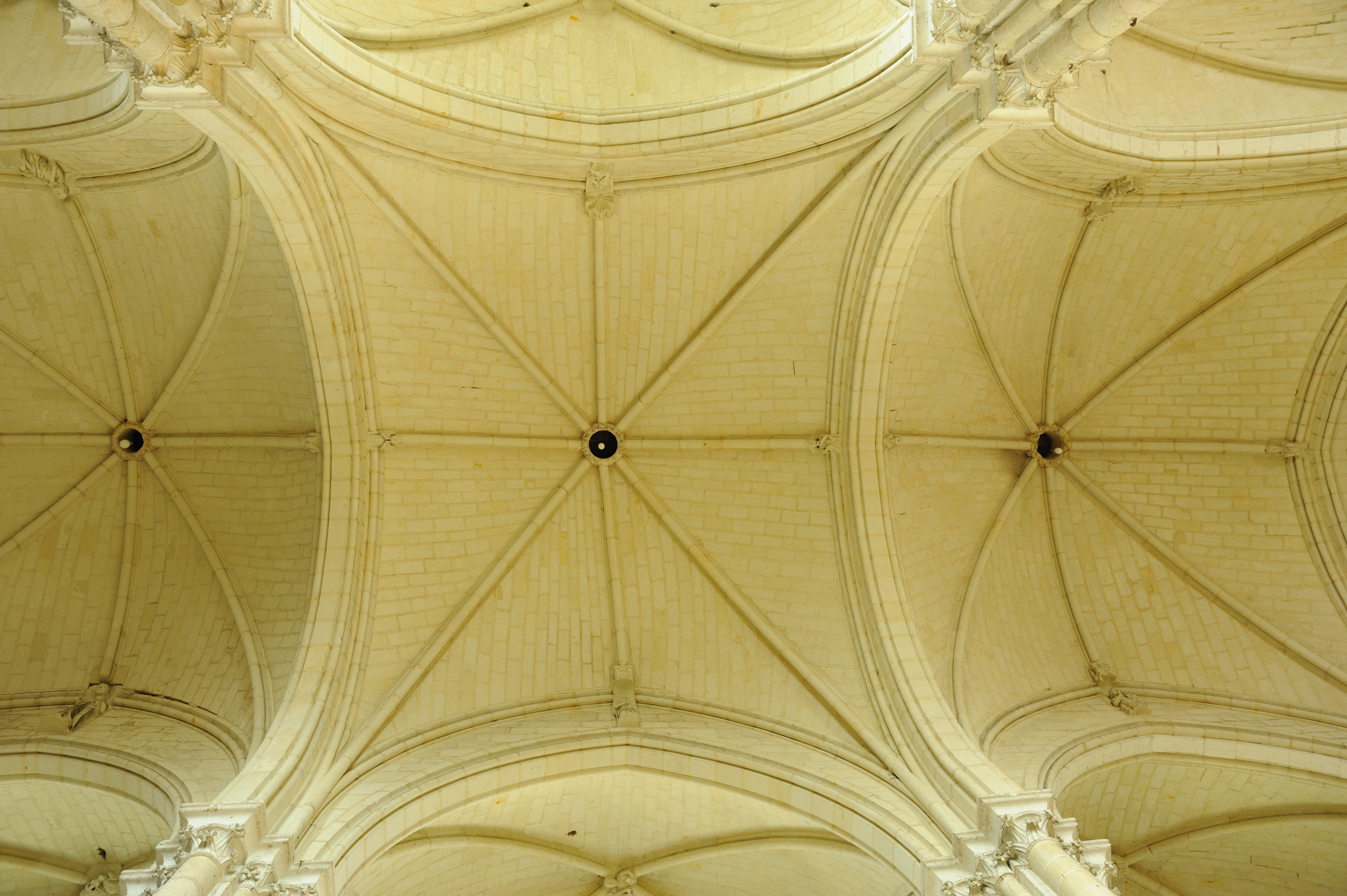
Angevin Gothic vault of the Church of Puy-Notre Dame

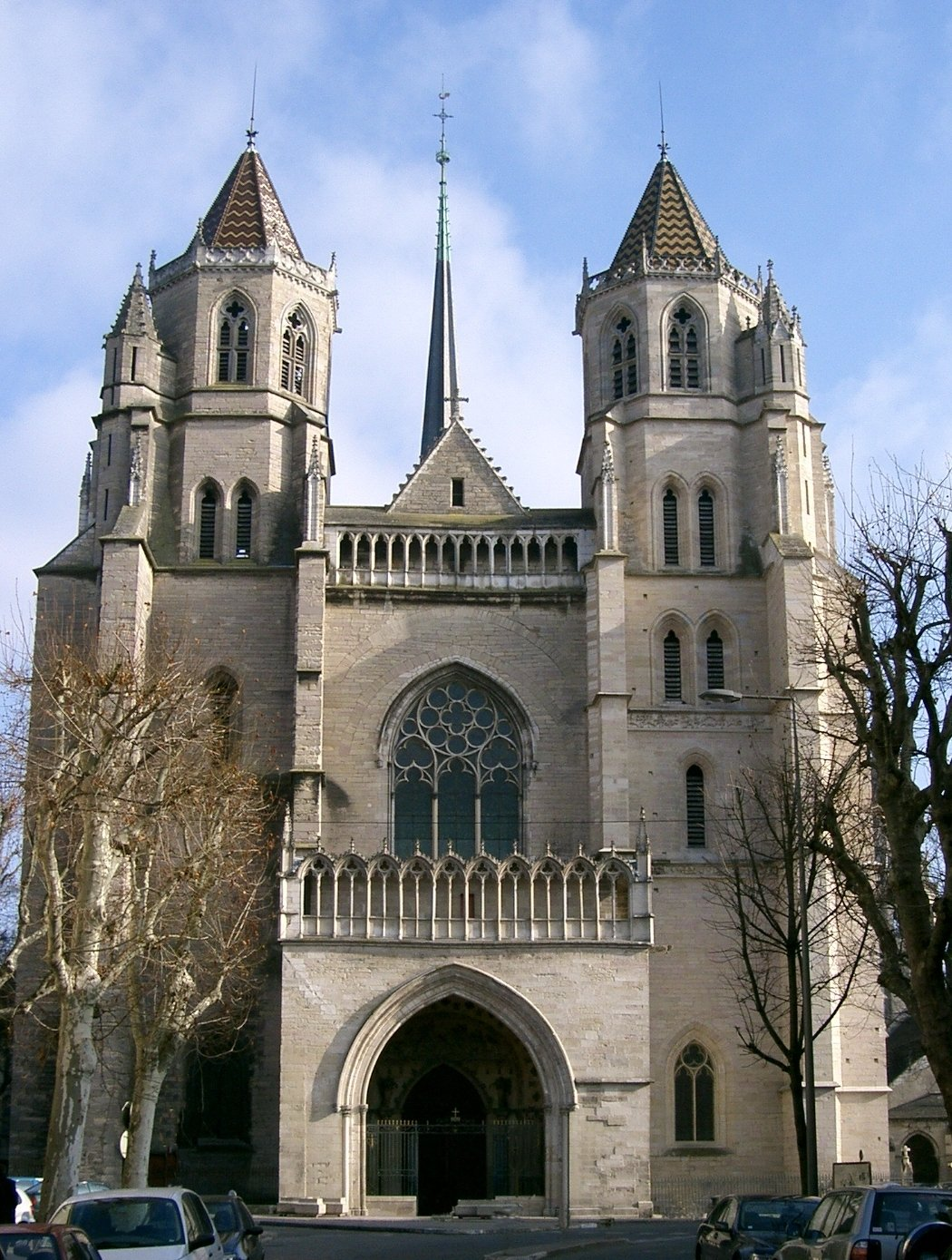
West facade of Dijon Cathedral in Burgundy (1280–1325)

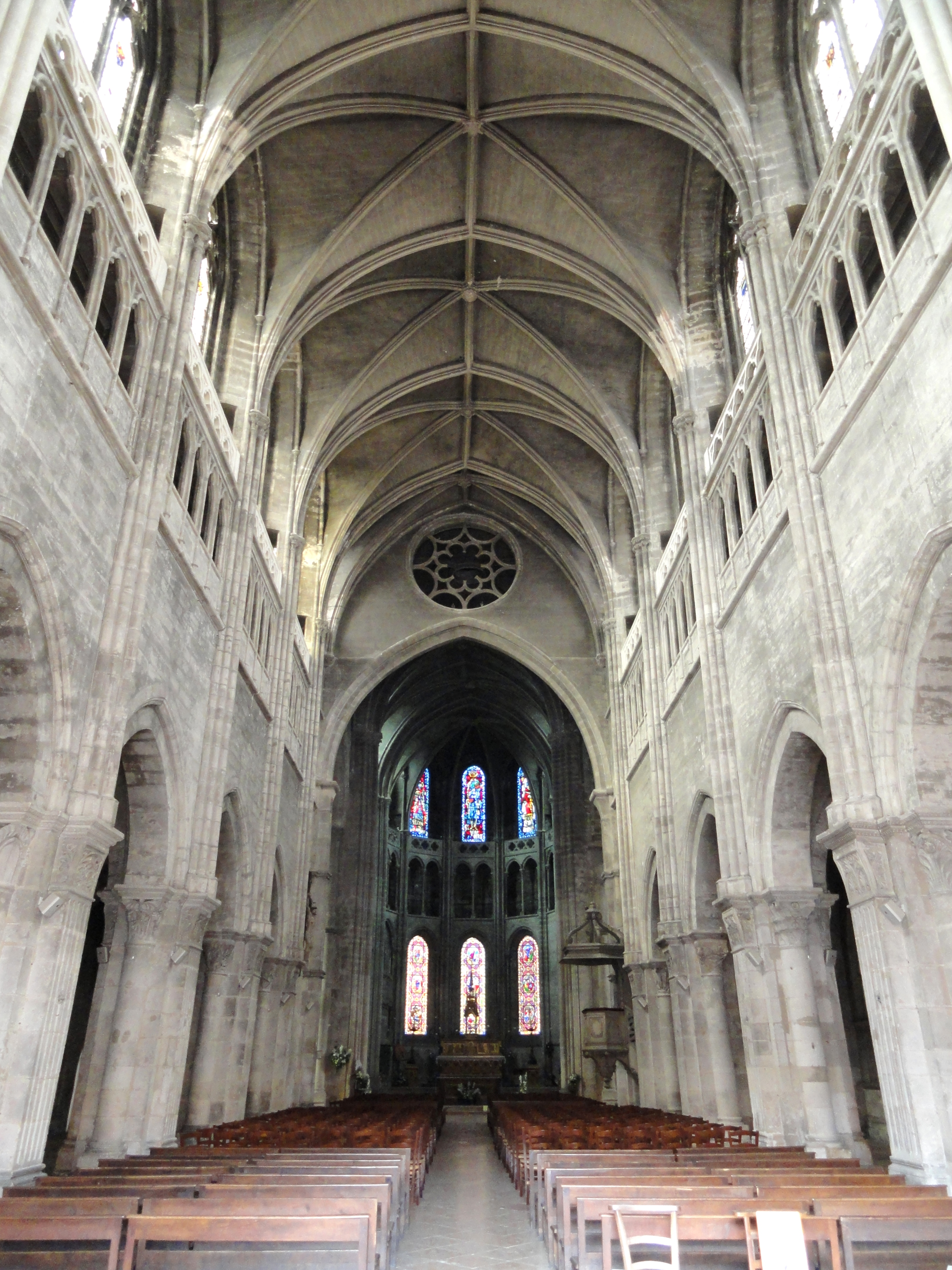
Nave of Chalon Cathedral in Burgundy (1220–1522)

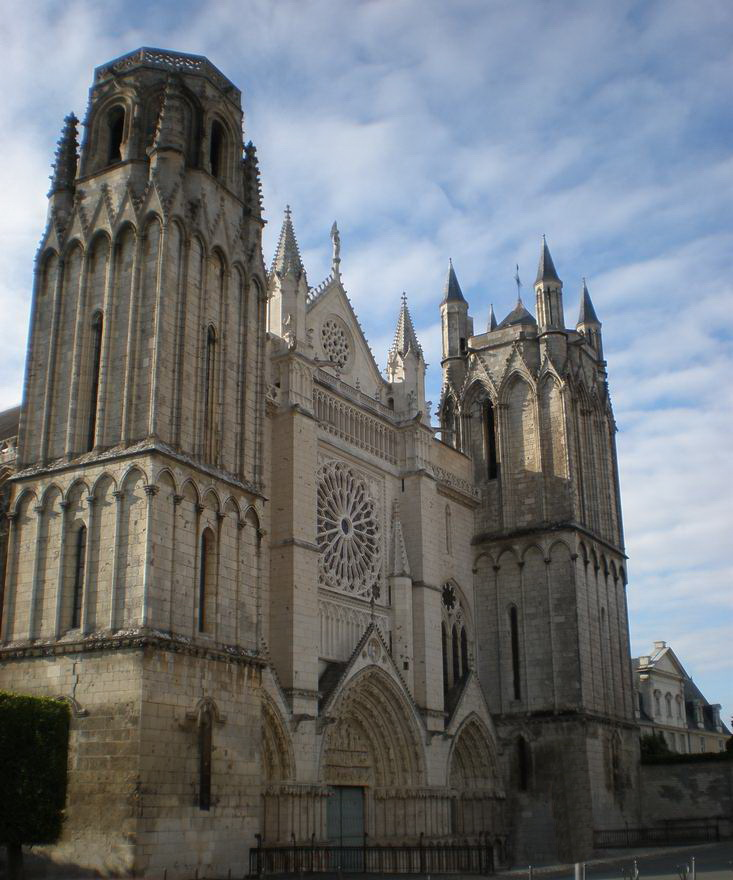
Facade of Poitiers Cathedral (1155–1379)

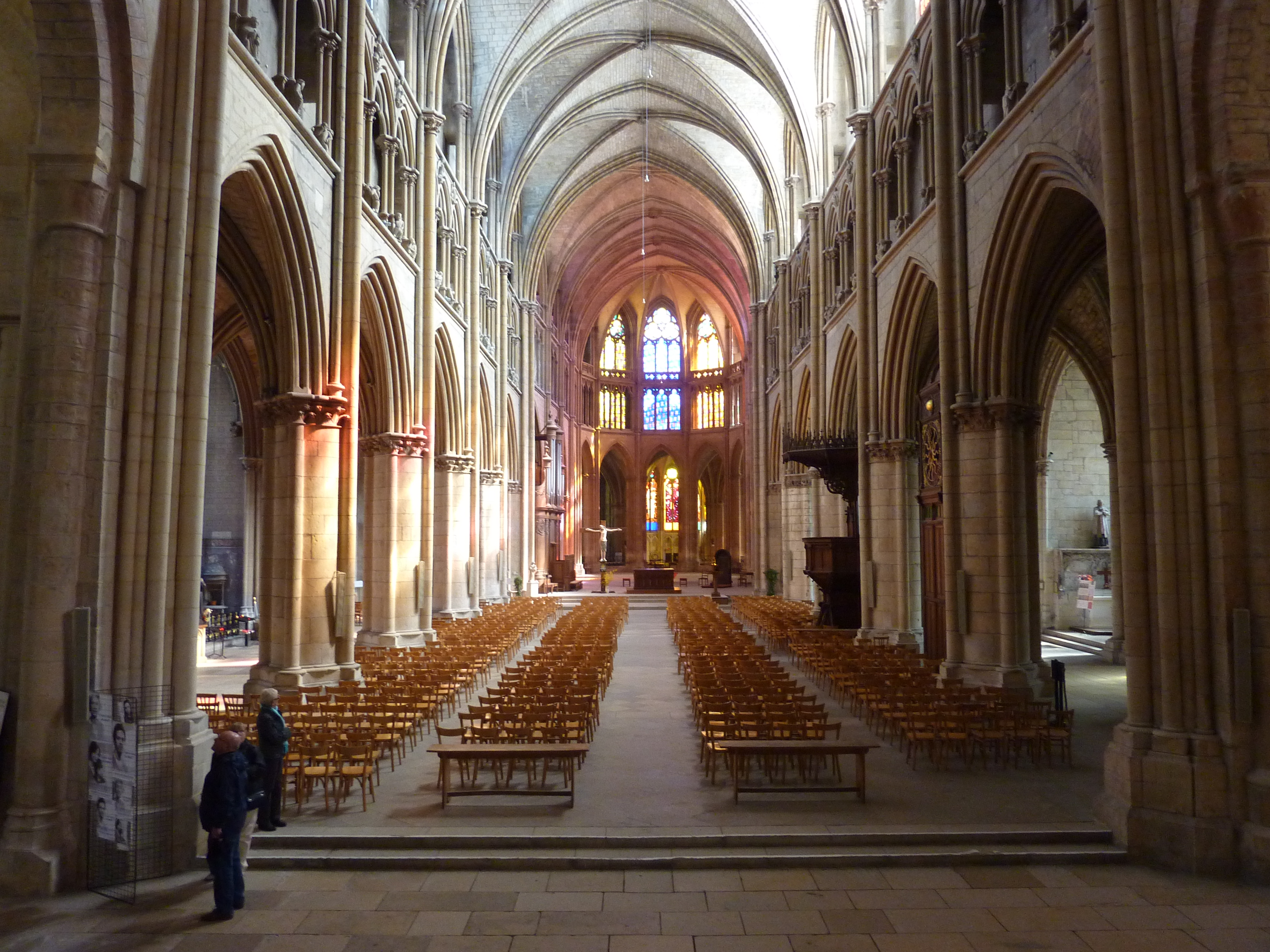
Choir of Nevers Cathedral (1211–1331)

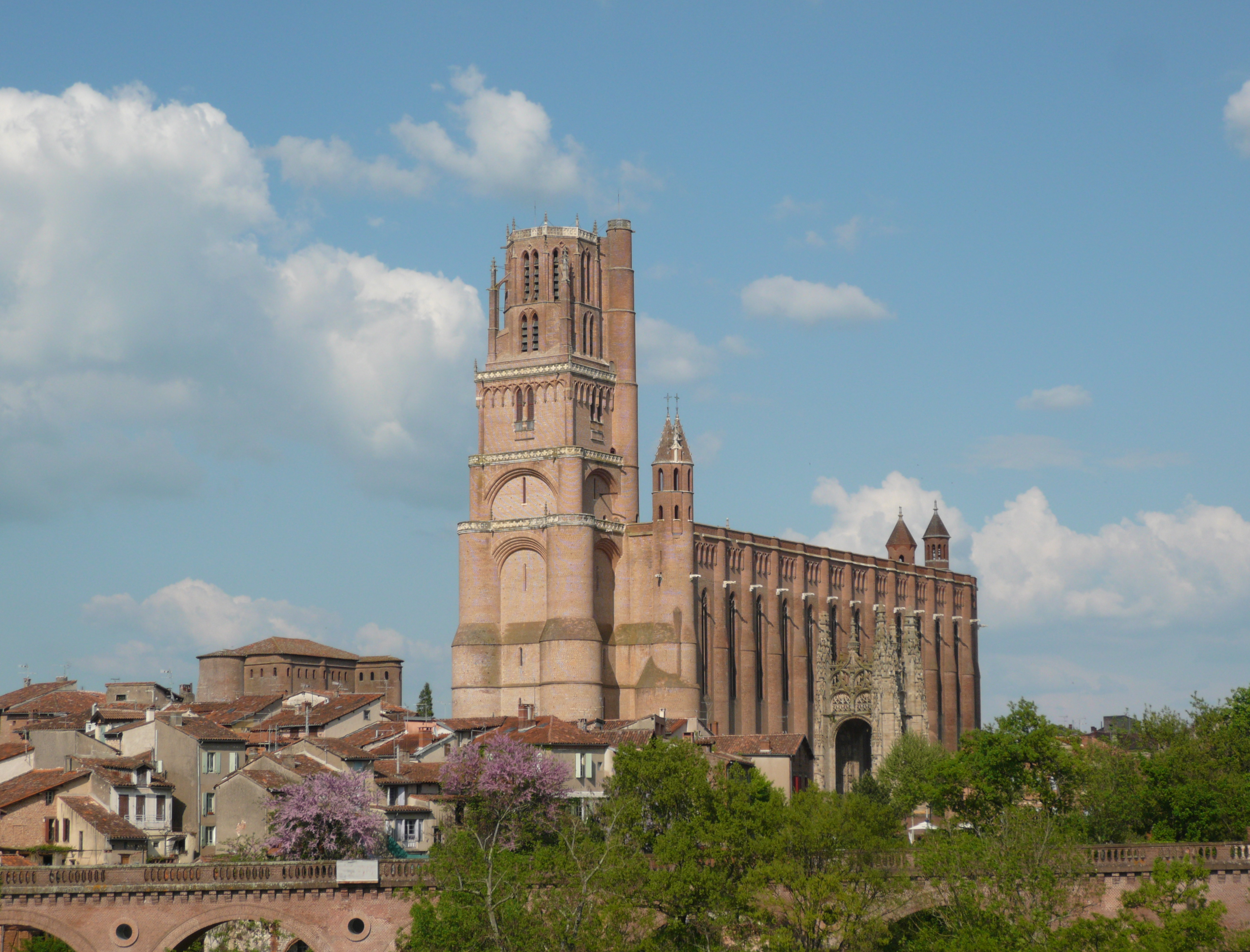
Albi Cathedral in southwest France (1282–1480), built of brick

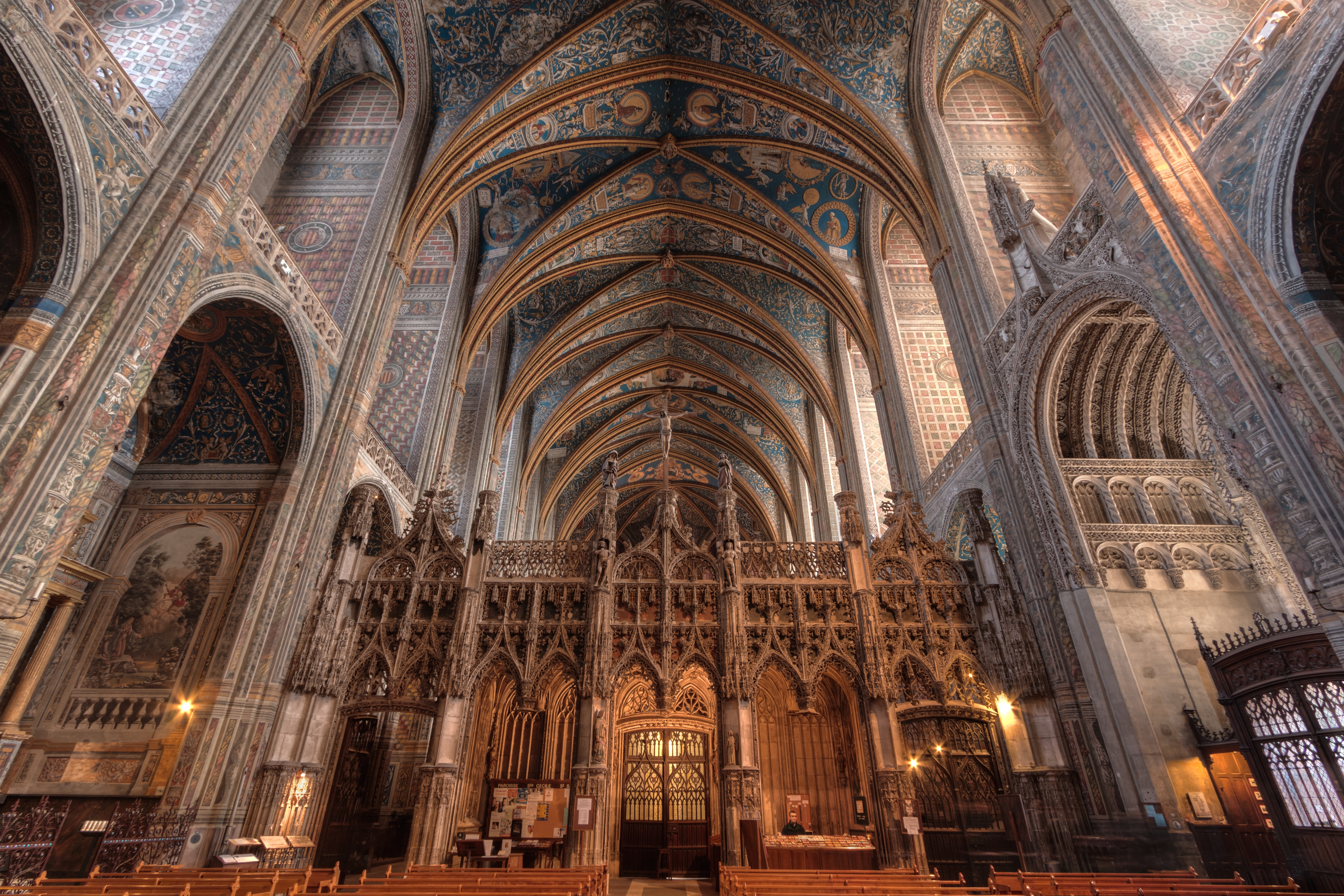
Polychrome nave of Albi Cathedral (1282–1480)

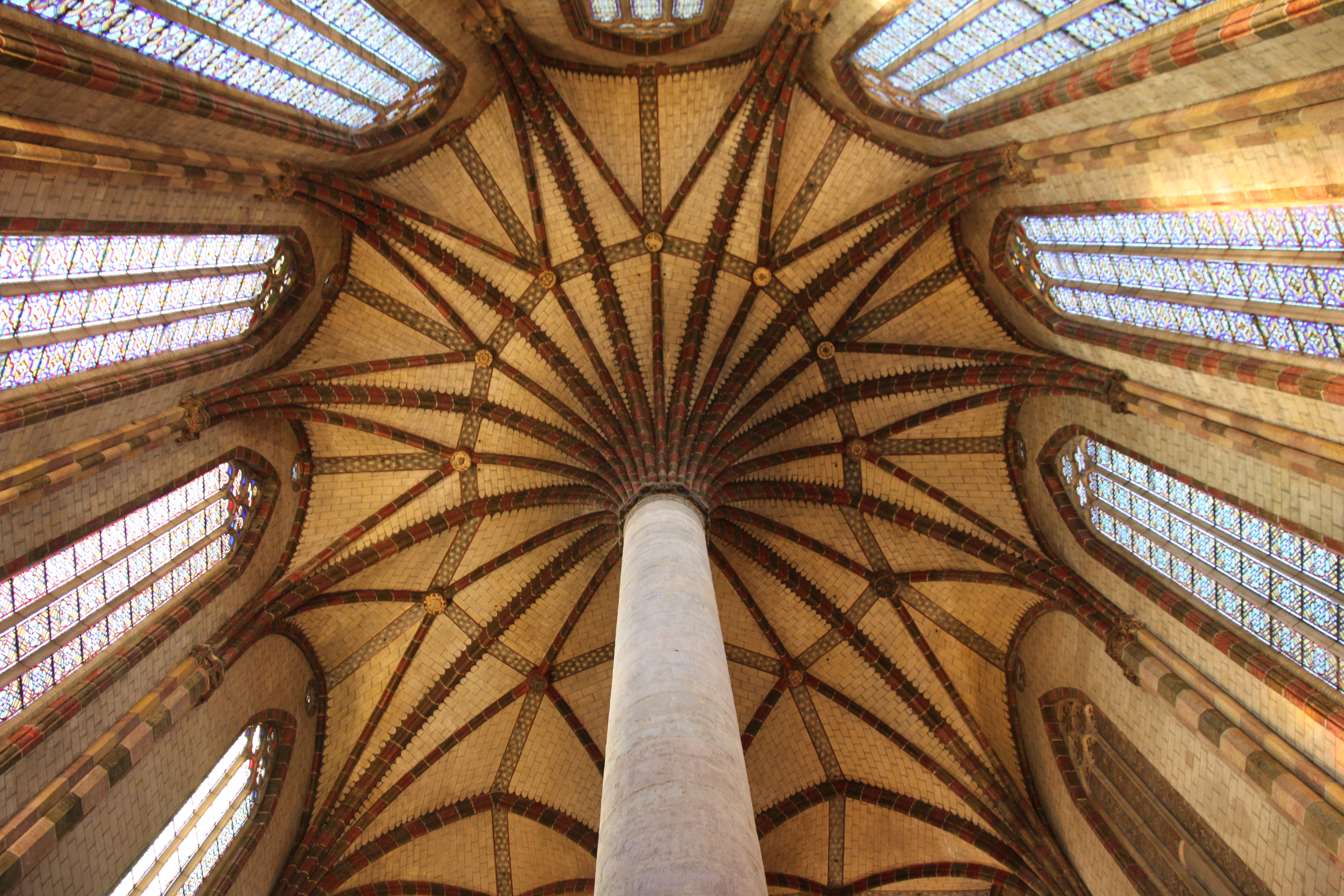
The Palm Tree of the Jacobins church (Toulouse, circa 1292)

The most famous examples of Gothic architecture are found in the Île-de-France and Champagne, but other French regions created their own original versions of the style.

=== Norman Gothic ===
Normandy at the end of the 12th century saw the construction of several notable Gothic cathedrals and churches. The characteristic features of Norman Gothic were sharply pointed arches, lavish use of decorative molding, and walls pierced with numerous passages. Norman architects and builders were active not only in Normandy, but also across the Channel in England. The high-quality Norman stone was cut and transported to England for use in English cathedrals.

Notable examples of Norman Gothic include Lisieux Cathedral, Fécamp Abbey, the chevet of Abbey of Saint-Étienne, Caen; Rouen Cathedral; Coutances Cathedral, the chevet of Le Mans Cathedral; Bayeux Cathedral; and the celebrated monastery at Mont-Saint-Michel.

=== Angevin Gothic ===
The Angevin Gothic style or Plantagenet style in the province of Anjou features vaults with elegant decorative ribs, as well as ornate columns. Angevin rib vaults tend to be more dome-like in profile than those of the Île-de-France, and the centre of each vault is placed higher than the apex of its transverse arches. The style is found in the interior of Angers Cathedral (1032–1523), though many of the Gothic elements of the facade were replaced with Renaissance elements and towers. A fine example of Angevin Gothic is found in the medieval Saint Jean Hospital in Angers, which now contains the Musée Jean-Lurçat, a museum of contemporary tapestries.

=== Maine Gothic ===
Poitiers Cathedral in the historic province of Maine also features a distinctive regional Gothic style. It was begun in 1162 under King Henry II of England and Eleanor of Aquitaine. Its distinctive features, like those of Angevin Gothic, include convex vaults with ribs in decorative designs.

=== Burgundian Gothic ===
Burgundy also had its own version of Gothic, found in Nevers Cathedral (1211–1331), Dijon Cathedral (1280–1325), Chalon Cathedral (1220–1522), and Auxerre Cathedral (13th-16th century). The Burgundian Gothic tended to be more sober and monumental than the more ornate northern style, and often included elements of earlier Romanesque churches on the same site, such as the Romanesque crypt beneath the Gothic choir at Auxerre Cathedral. Other Burgundian features included colourful tile roofs in geometric patterns (Langres Cathedral).

=== Meridional Gothic ===
The south of France had its own distinct variation of the Gothic style: the Meriodonal or Southern French Gothic. A prominent example is Albi Cathedral in the Tarn Department, built between 1282 and 1480. It was originally constructed as a fortress, then transformed into a church. Due to a lack of suitable stone, it was constructed almost entirely of brick, and is one of the largest brick buildings in the world. In the Jacobins church of Toulouse, the grafting of a single apse of polygonal plan on a church with two vessels gave birth to a starry vault whose complex organization preceded by more than a century the Flamboyant Gothic. Tradition refers to this masterpiece as "palm tree" because the veins gush out of the smooth shaft of the column, like the fronds of palm trees.

== Gothic civil architecture ==
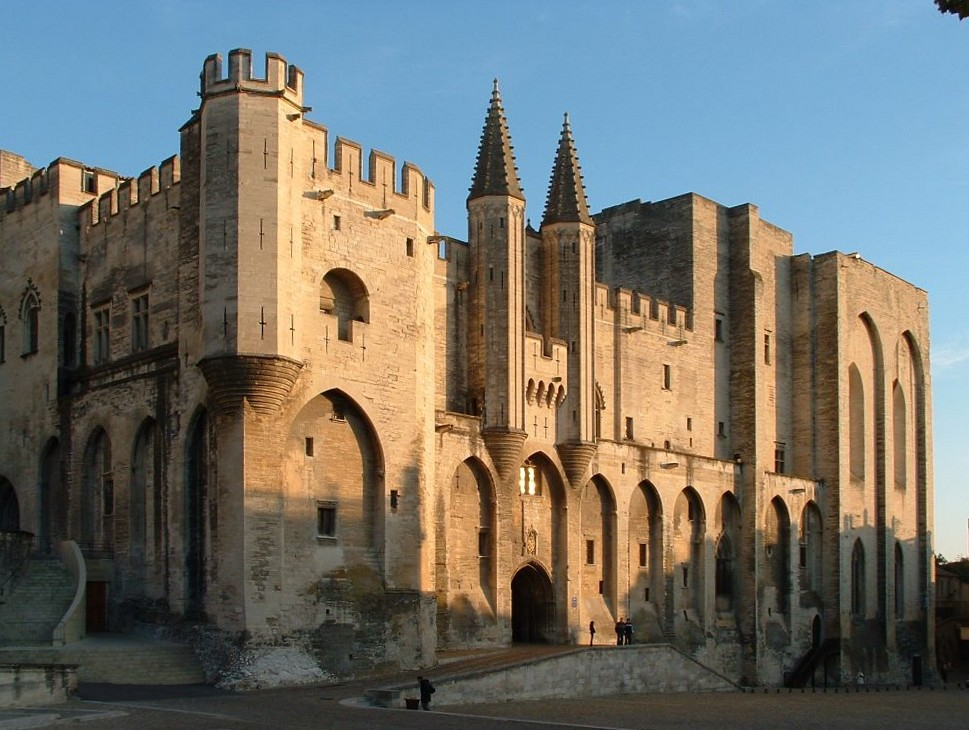
The façade of the Palais des Papes in Avignon (1252–1364)

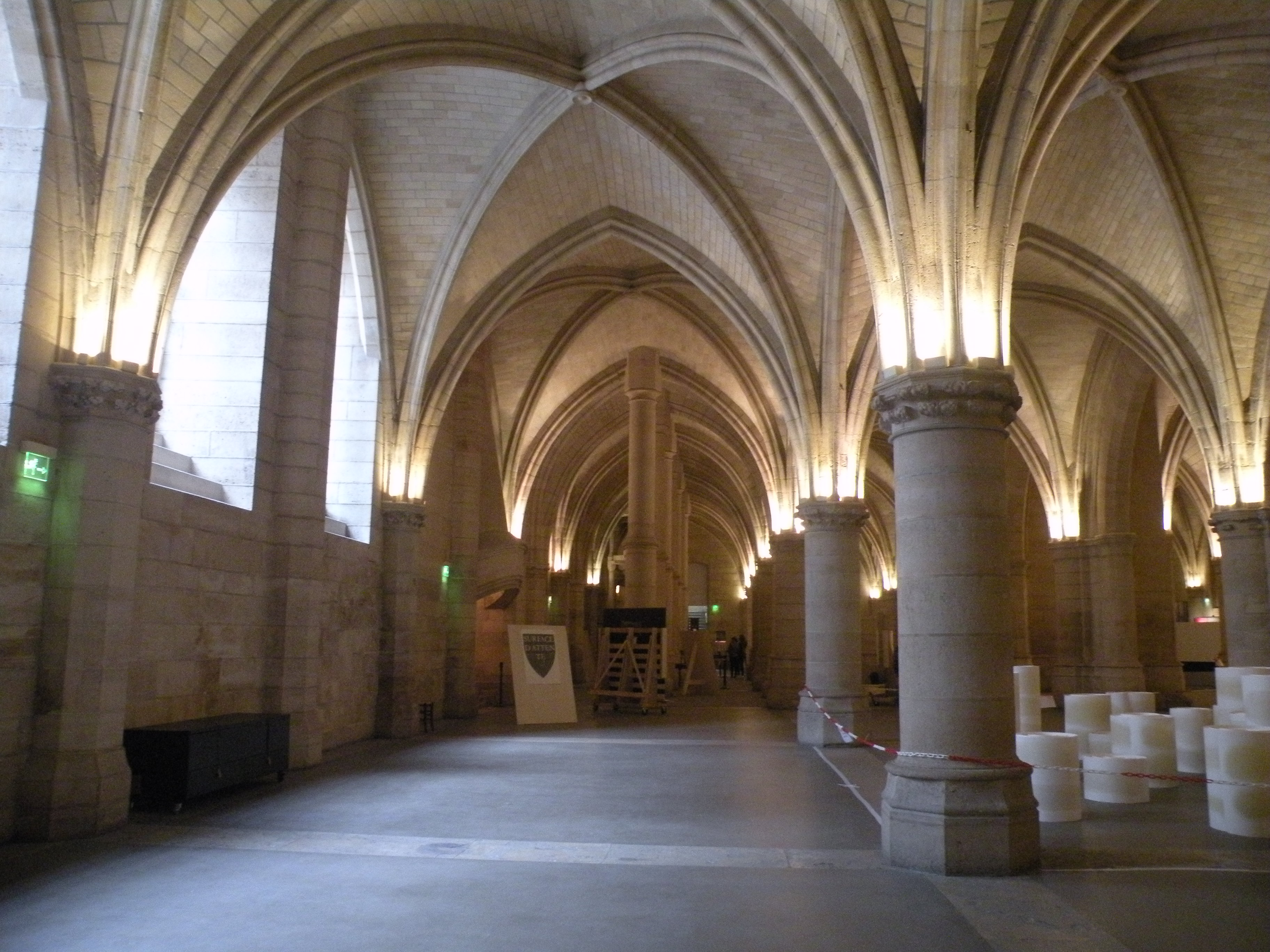
Gothic rib vaults of the hall of men at arms of the Conciergerie (1302)

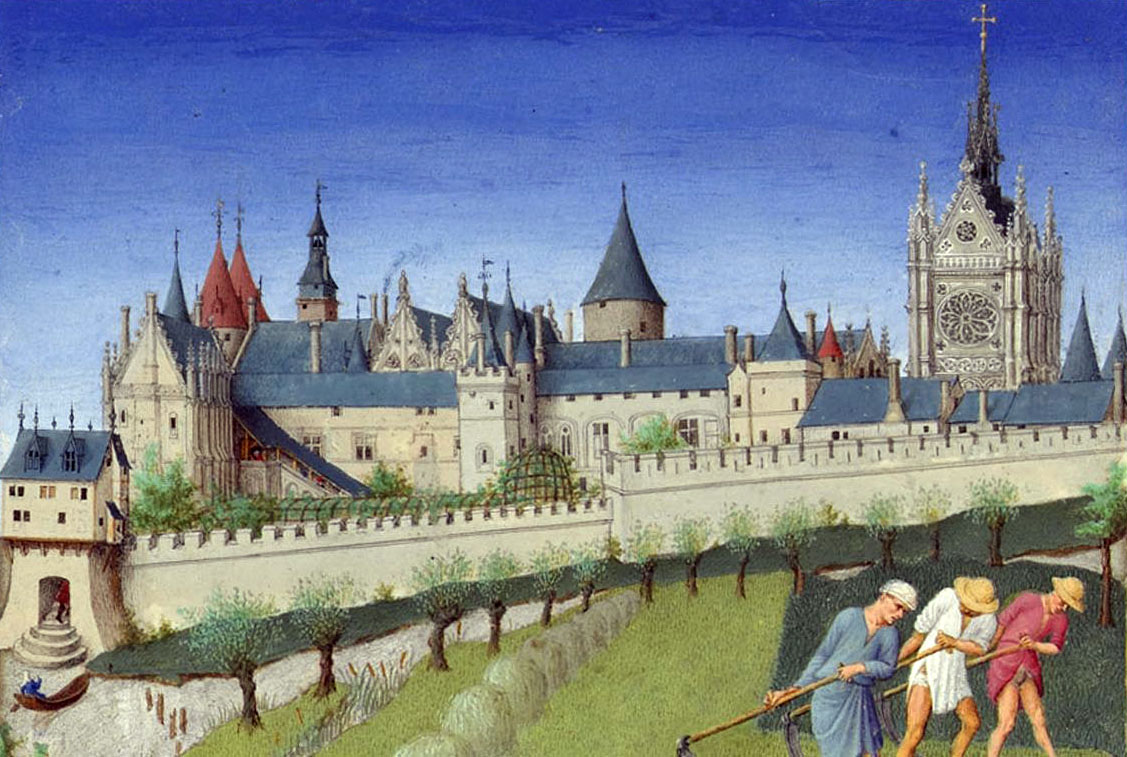
The Palais de la Cité in Paris, which included the royal residence and Sainte-Chapelle (illuminated manuscript from 1412 to 1416)

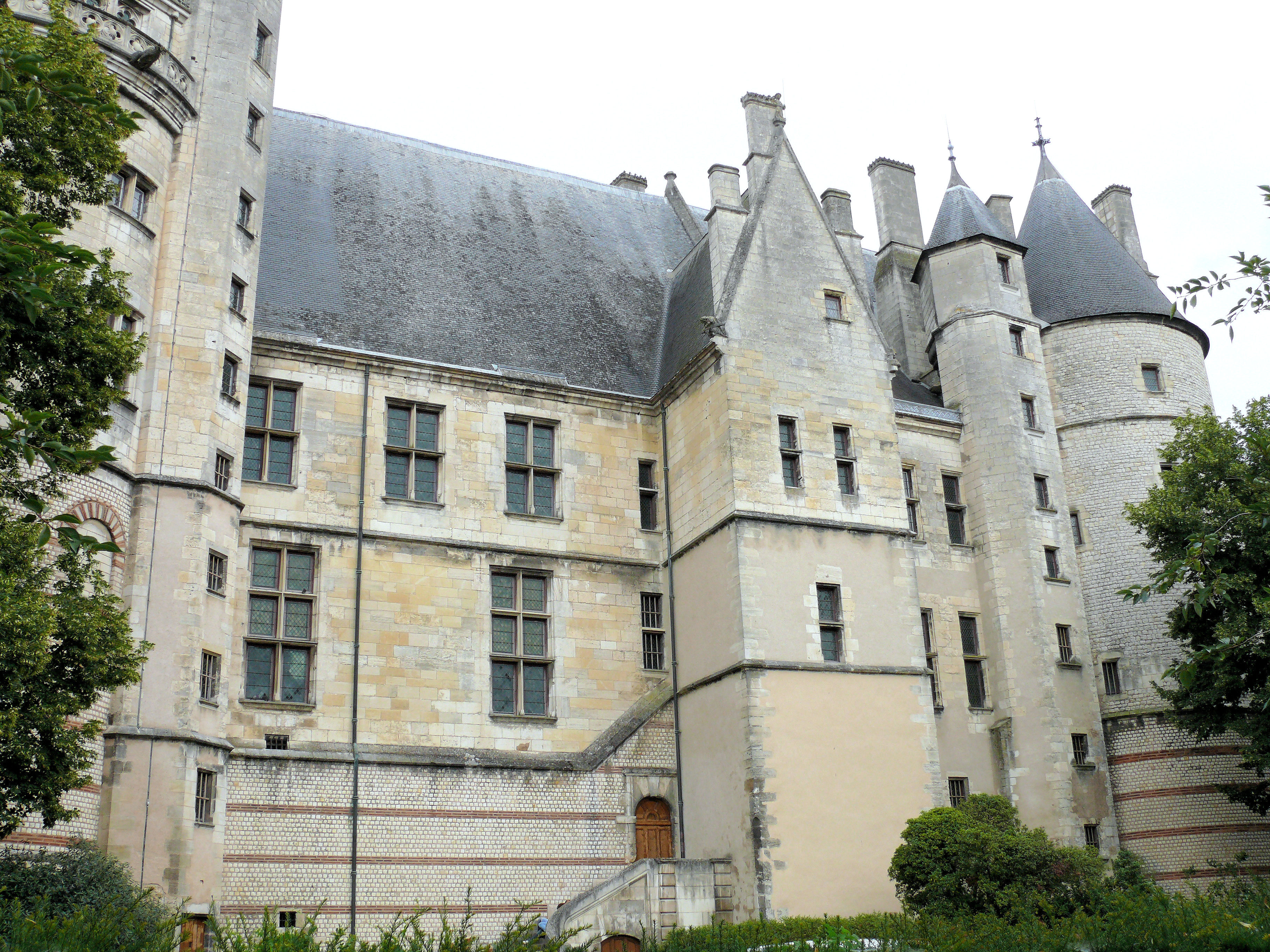
Palace of Jacques Cœur in Bourges (1440–1450)

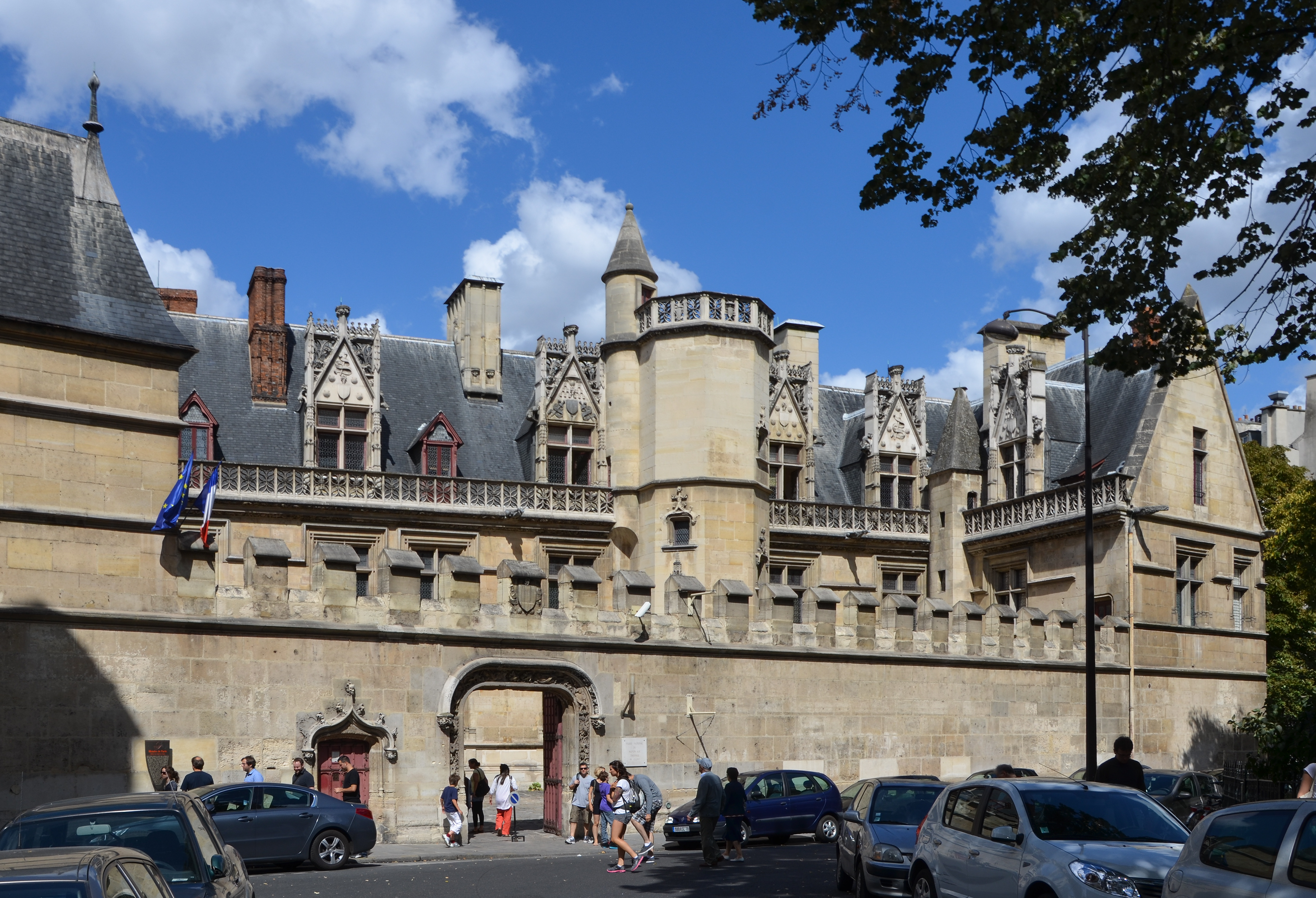
Musée de Cluny – Musée national du Moyen Âge in Paris (1334–1510)

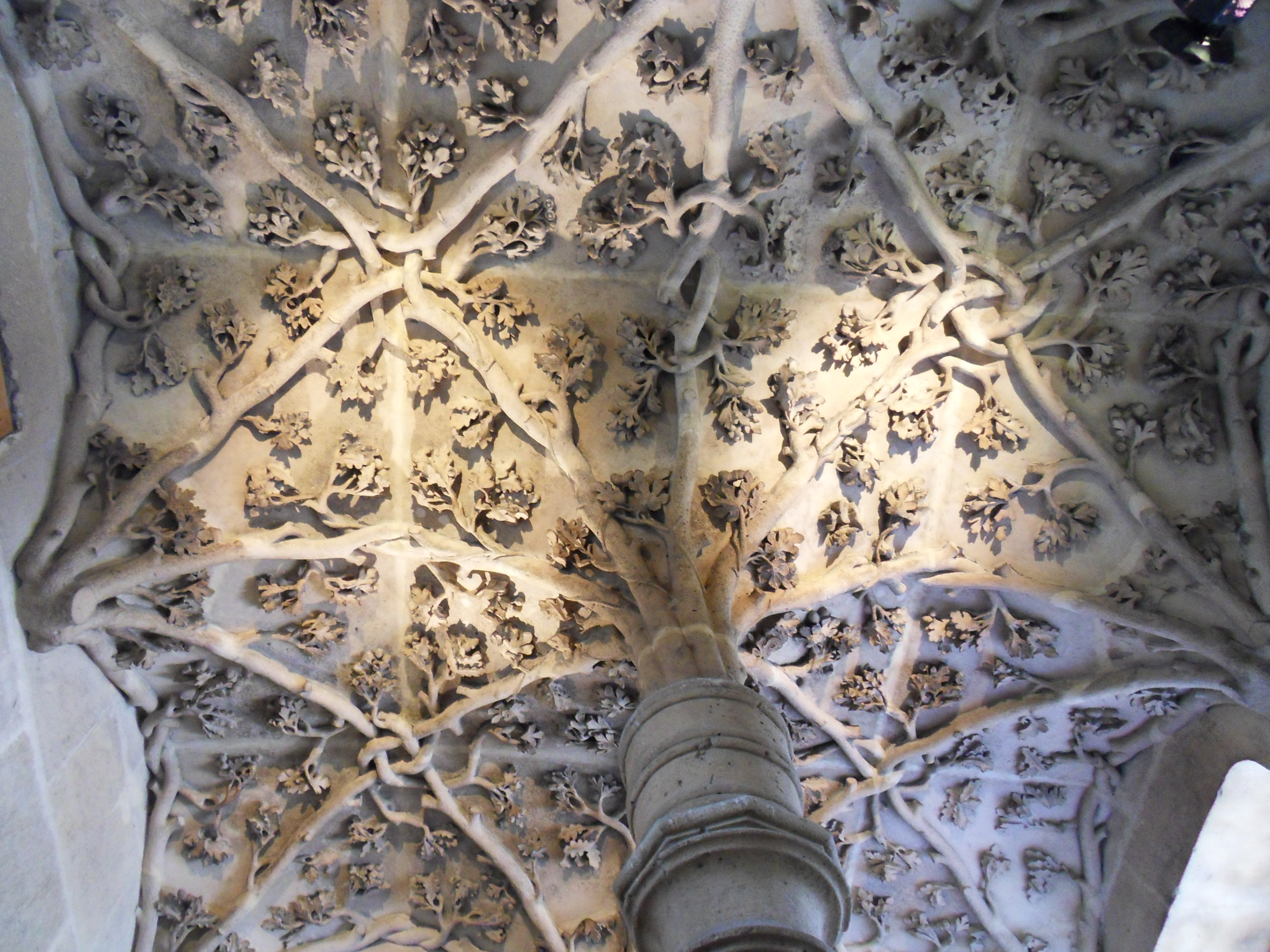
Flamboyant Gothic ceiling above the staircase in the Tour Jean-sans-Peur in Paris (1409–1411)

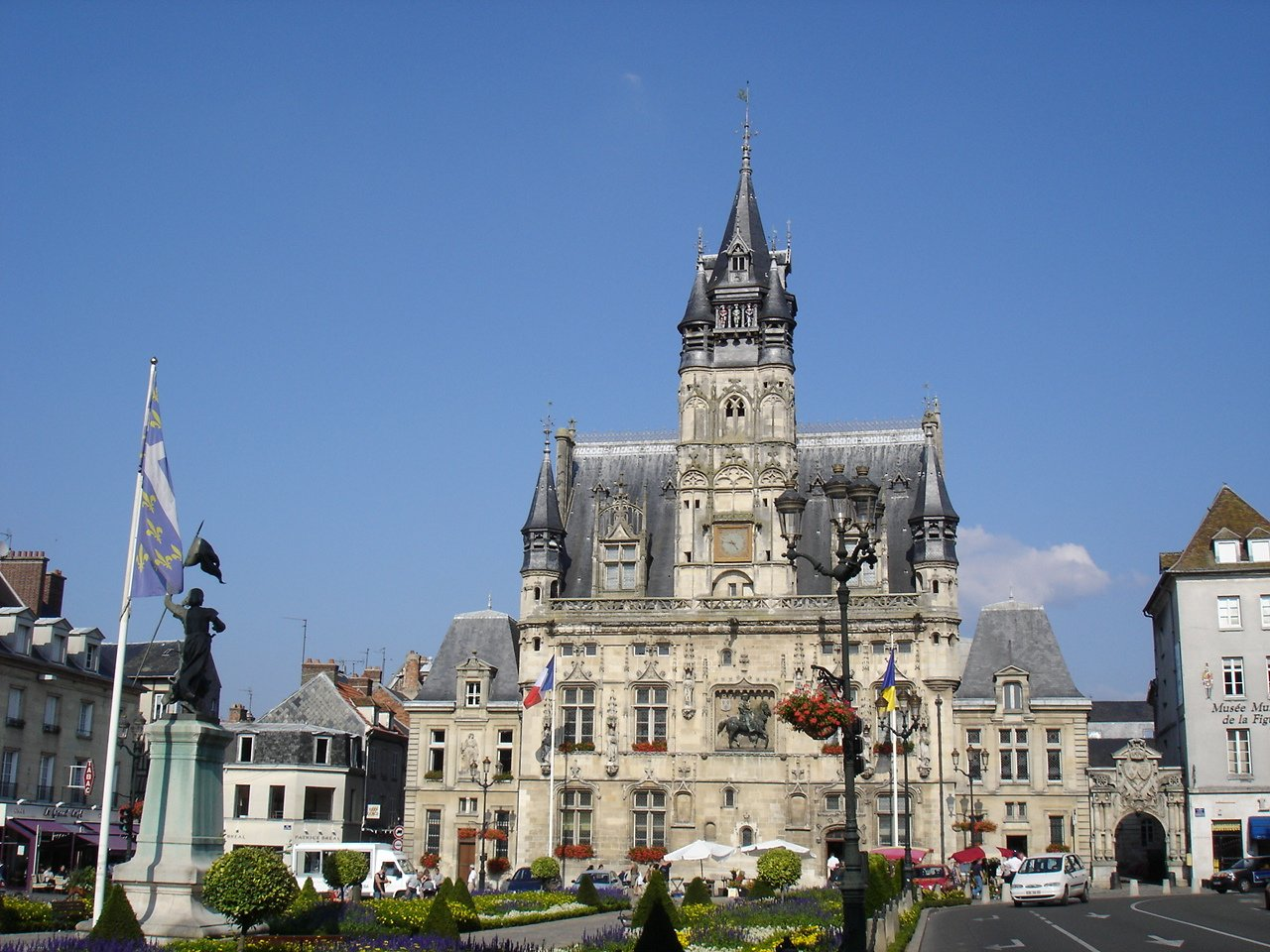
Hôtel de Ville of Compiègne (15th century)

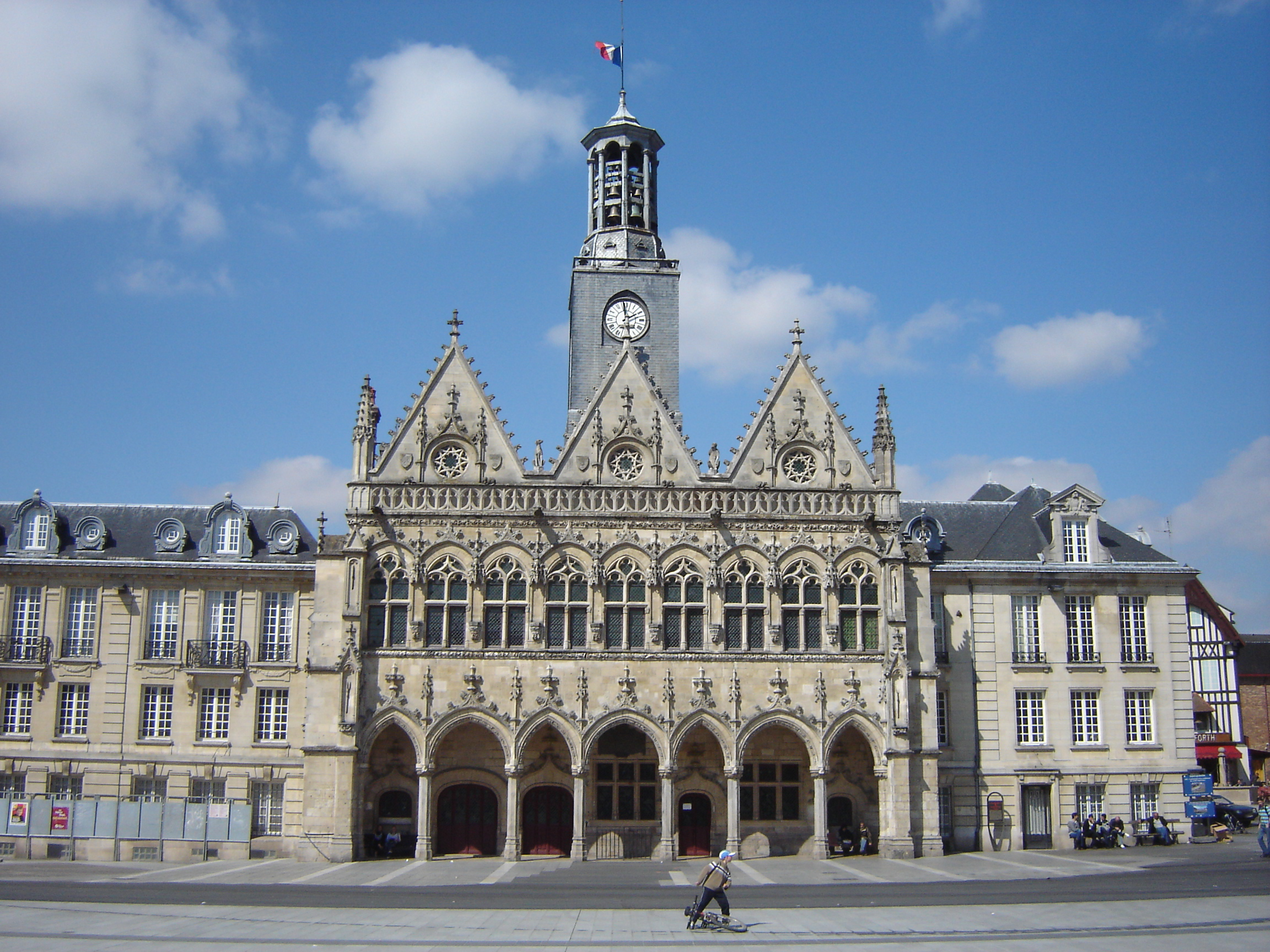
City Hall of Saint-Quentin, Aisne (1509)

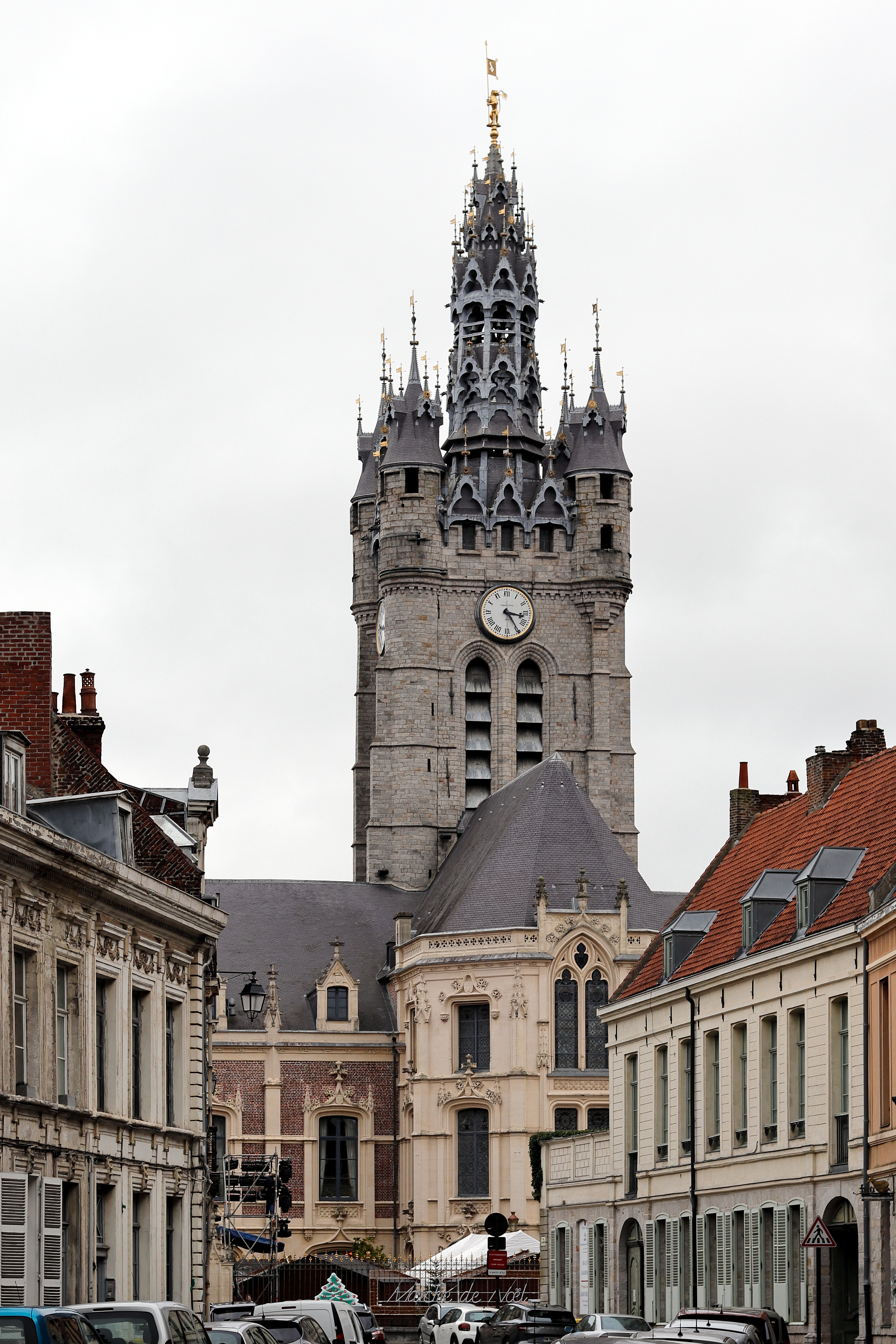
Carillon of the Hôtel de Ville of Douai

The largest civic building built in the Gothic style in France was the Palais des Papes (Palace of the Popes) in Avignon, constructed between 1252 and 1364, when the Popes fled the political chaos and wars enveloping Rome. Given the complicated political situation, it combined the functions of a church, a seat of government and a fortress.

In the 15th century, following the Late Gothic or Flamboyant period, some elements of Gothic decoration borrowed from cathedrals began to appear in civil architecture, particularly in the region of Flanders in northern France, and in Paris. The Hôtel de Ville of Compiègne has an imposing Gothic bell tower, featuring a spire surrounded by smaller towers, and its windows are decorated with ornate accolades or ornamental arches. Similarly, flamboyant town halls were found in Arras, Douai, and Saint-Quentin, Aisne, and across the border in Belgium in Brussels and Bruges. Unfortunately, many of the finest buildings were destroyed during World War I, due to their proximity to the front lines.

Gothic features also appeared in the elaborate residences built by the nobility and wealthy bourgeoisie in Paris and other large cities. Examples include the Hôtel Cluny (now the Musée de Cluny – Musée national du Moyen Âge) in Paris, and particularly the palatial house built by merchant Jacques Cœur in Bourges (1440–1450). Another good example in Paris is the Tour Jean-sans-Peur, a nobleman's townhouse, which features a Gothic watch tower and a flamboyant gothic ceiling.

== Transition between Gothic and Renaissance ==
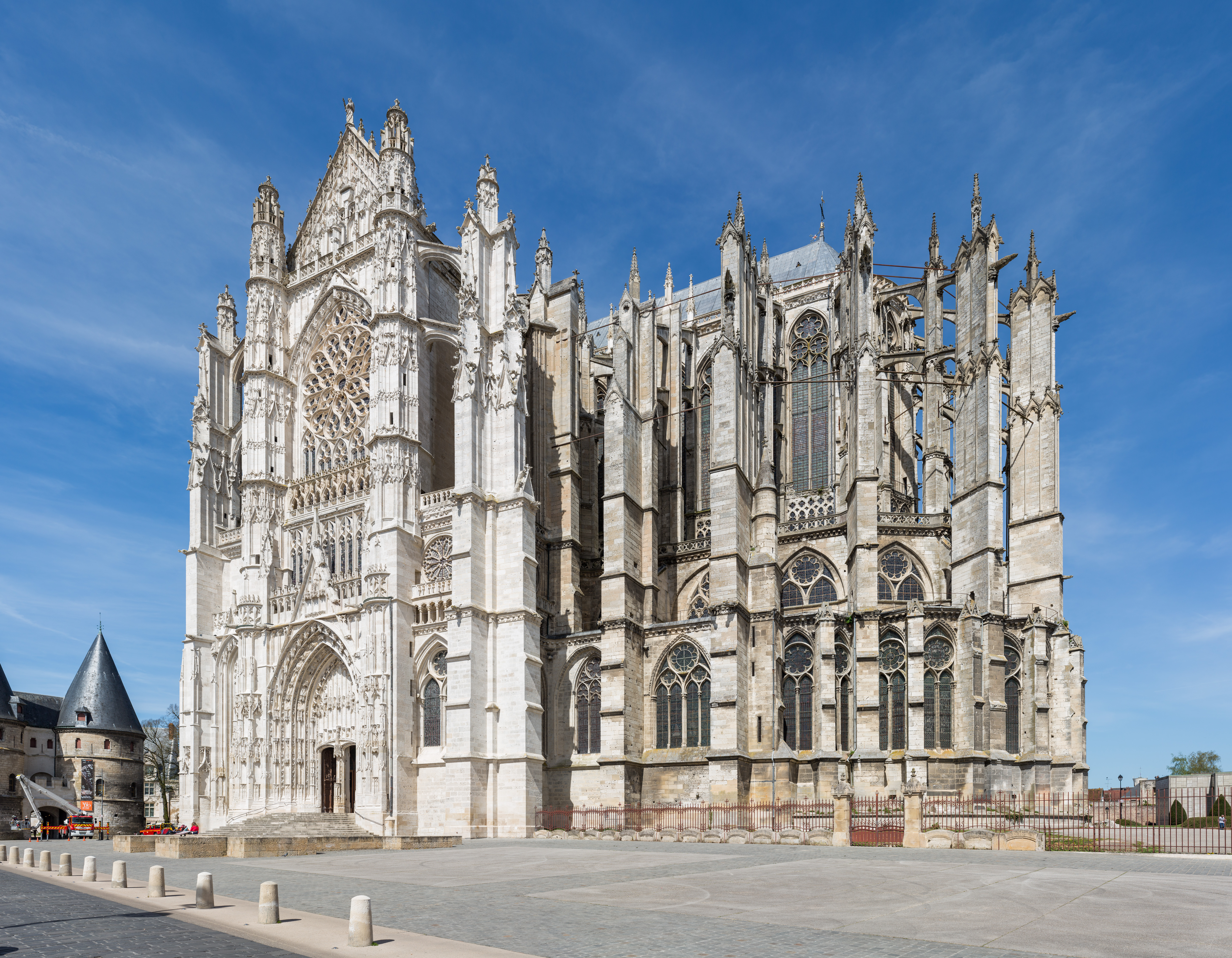
Unfinished Beauvais Cathedral lacking a nave and spire (1225–1272)

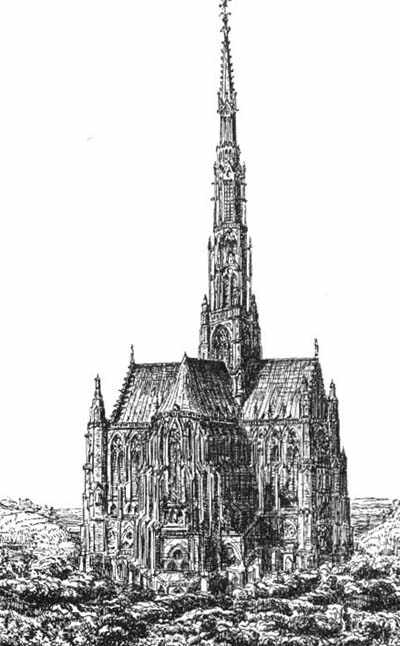
The spire of Beauvais Cathedral before its fall in 1573

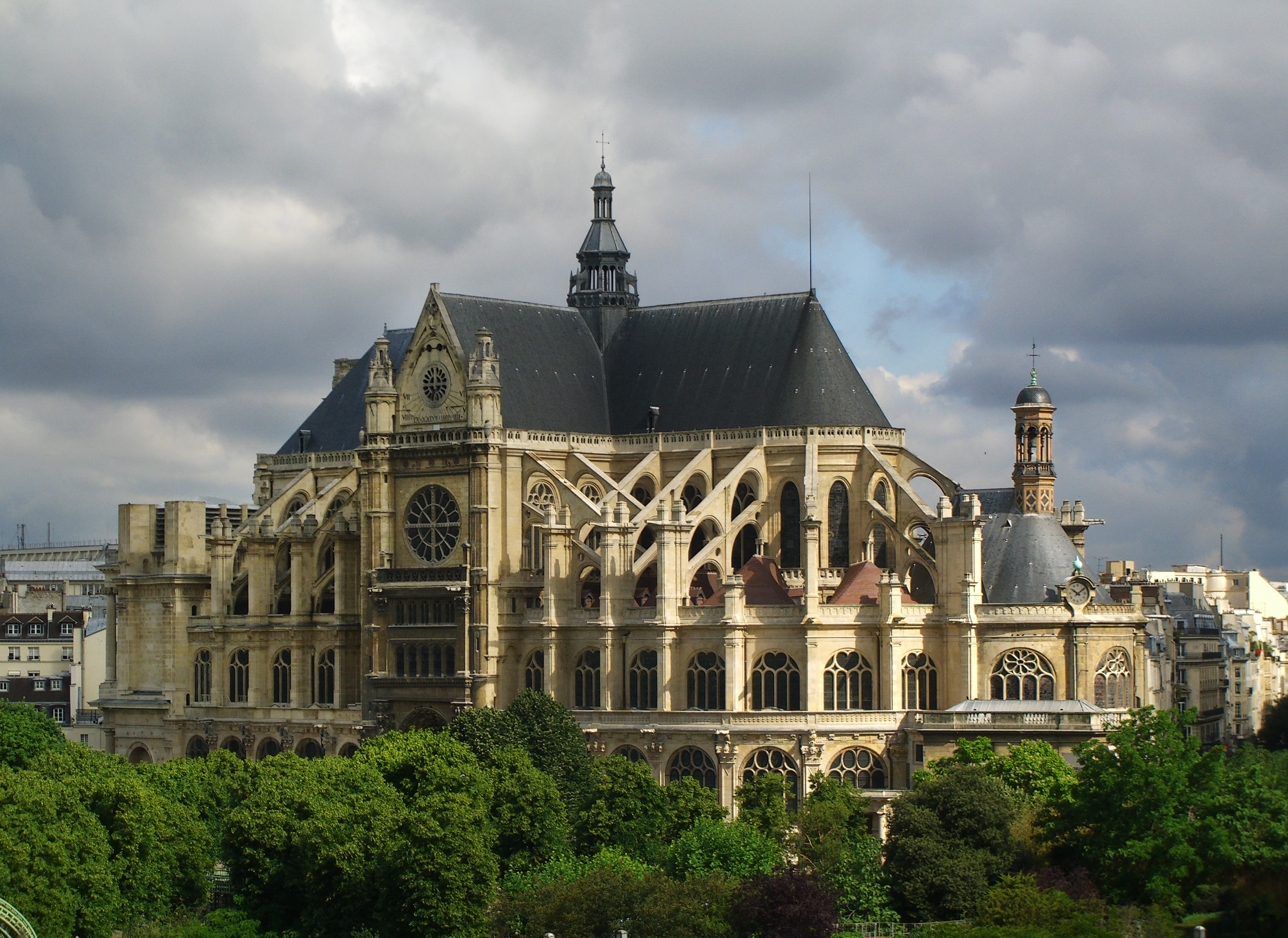
Saint Eustache, a gothic plan with Renaissance decoration (1532–1632)

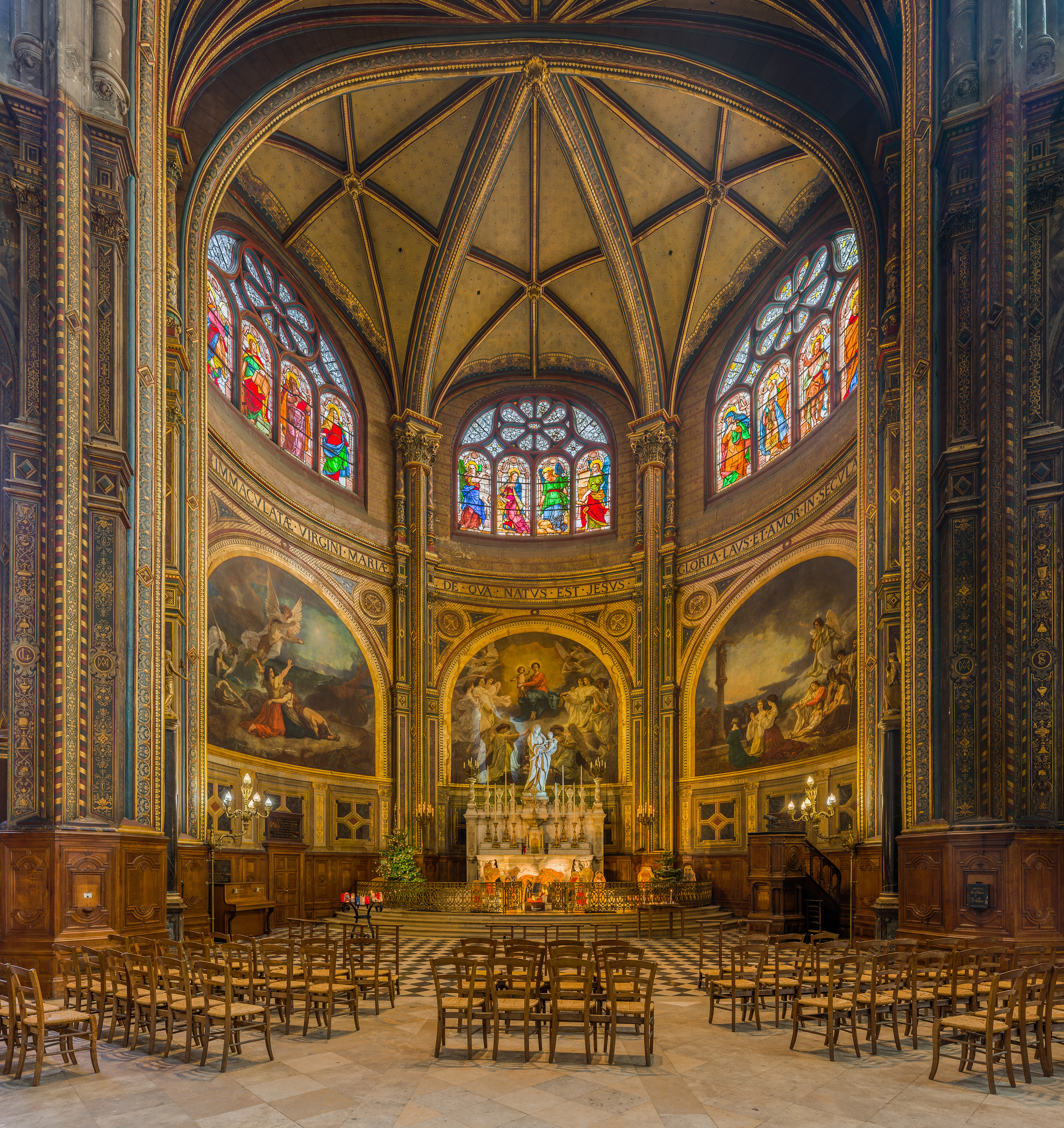
Chapel of the Virgin Mary in Saint Eustache

During the Middle Ages Prosperous French cities competed to build the largest cathedral or the highest tower. One of the drawbacks of French Gothic architecture was its cost; it required many skilled craftsmen working for decades. Due to downturns in the economy, a number of French cathedrals were begun but never finished. They also sometimes suffered when the ambitions of the architects exceeded their technical skills. One example was Beauvais Cathedral. Its patrons and architects sought to build the tallest church in the world. with a vaulted choir 48 meters high, taller than its nearby competitor, Amiens Cathedral, at 42 meters. Work began in 1225 but the roof of the vault was too heavy for the walls, and partially collapsed in 1272. They thickened the walls and rebuilt the vault and in 1569 they completed a tower, 72 meters high, which from 1569 to 1573 made Beauvais Cathedral the tallest structure in the world. However, in 1573, the new tower collapsed, fortunately without any casualties. The church remains today as it was, with the choir, some of the ambulatory, apse, some chapels, but no nave or tower.

Beginning in the 1530s, the Flamboyant Gothic style of French religious and civil architecture also began to show the influence of the Italian Renaissance. Charles VIII of France and Louis XII of France had both participated in military campaigns in Italy, and had seen the new architecture there. Large numbers of Italian stonemasons had come to Paris to work on the new Pont Notre-Dame (1507–1512) and other construction sites. The Fontaine des Innocents, built by sculptor Jean Goujon to celebrate the entrance of Henry II into Paris in 1549, was the first Renaissance monument in the city. It was soon followed by the new facade of the Cour Carré of the Louvre, also decorated by Jean Goujon. The new Paris Hotel de Ville (1533–1568) was also constructed in an Italianate rather than Gothic style. Most important of all, the new Tuileries Palace by Philippe Delorme, built for Catherine de' Medici, begun in 1564, was inspired by Italian palaces.

Religious buildings were slower to change. The Church of the Carmes-Deschaussé (1613–1620) on rue Vaugirard in Paris, and especially the church of St-Gervais-et-St-Protais by Salomon de Brosse (1615–21) with a facade based on the superposition of the three orders of classical architecture, represented the new model. However, the Gothic style remained prominent in new churches. The Church of Saint Eustache in Paris (1532–1640), which rivaled Notre-Dame in size, combined a Gothic plan with Renaissance decoration.

In the course of the 17th century, the French classical style of François Mansart began to dominate; then, under Louis XIV, the grand French classical style, practiced by Jules Hardouin-Mansart, Louis Le Vau, and Claude Perrault, took center stage. Landmarks of the Gothic style, such as Notre-Dame, were modified with new interiors designed in the new style. Following the new fashion of his patron, Louis XIV, the poet Molière ridiculed the Gothic style in a 1669 poem: "...the insipid taste of Gothic ornamentation, these odious monstrosities of an ignorant age, produced by the torrents of barbarism...".

During the French Revolution, Gothic churches were symbols of the old regime and became targets for the Revolutionaries; the cathedrals were nationalized, and stripped of ornament and valuables. The statues of the Biblical figures on the facade of Notre-Dame were beheaded, under the false belief that they were statues of the French Kings. Under Napoleon Bonaparte, the cathedrals were returned to the church, but were left in a lamentable state of repair.

== Military architecture ==
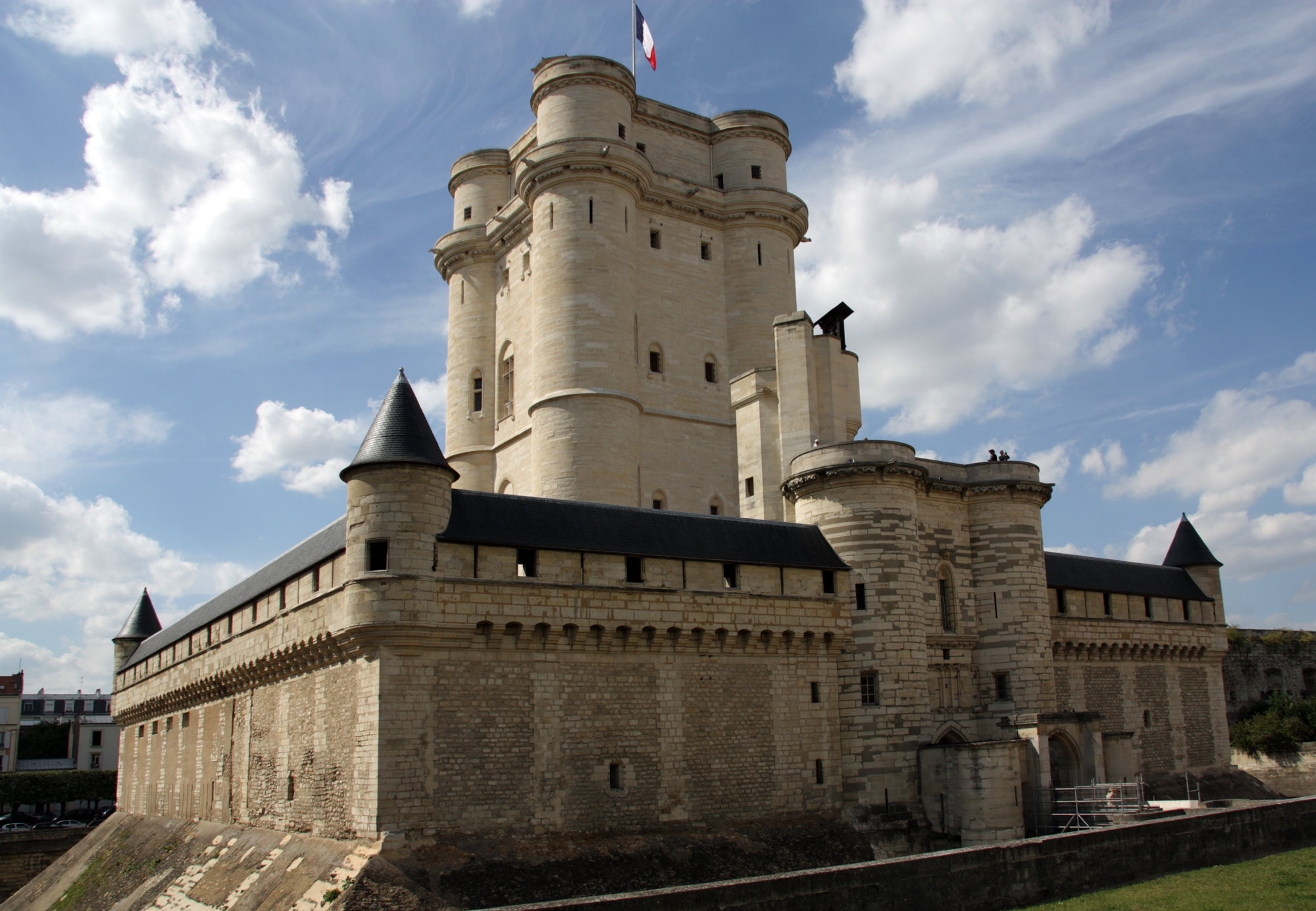
Donjon of the Château de Vincennes, begun 1337

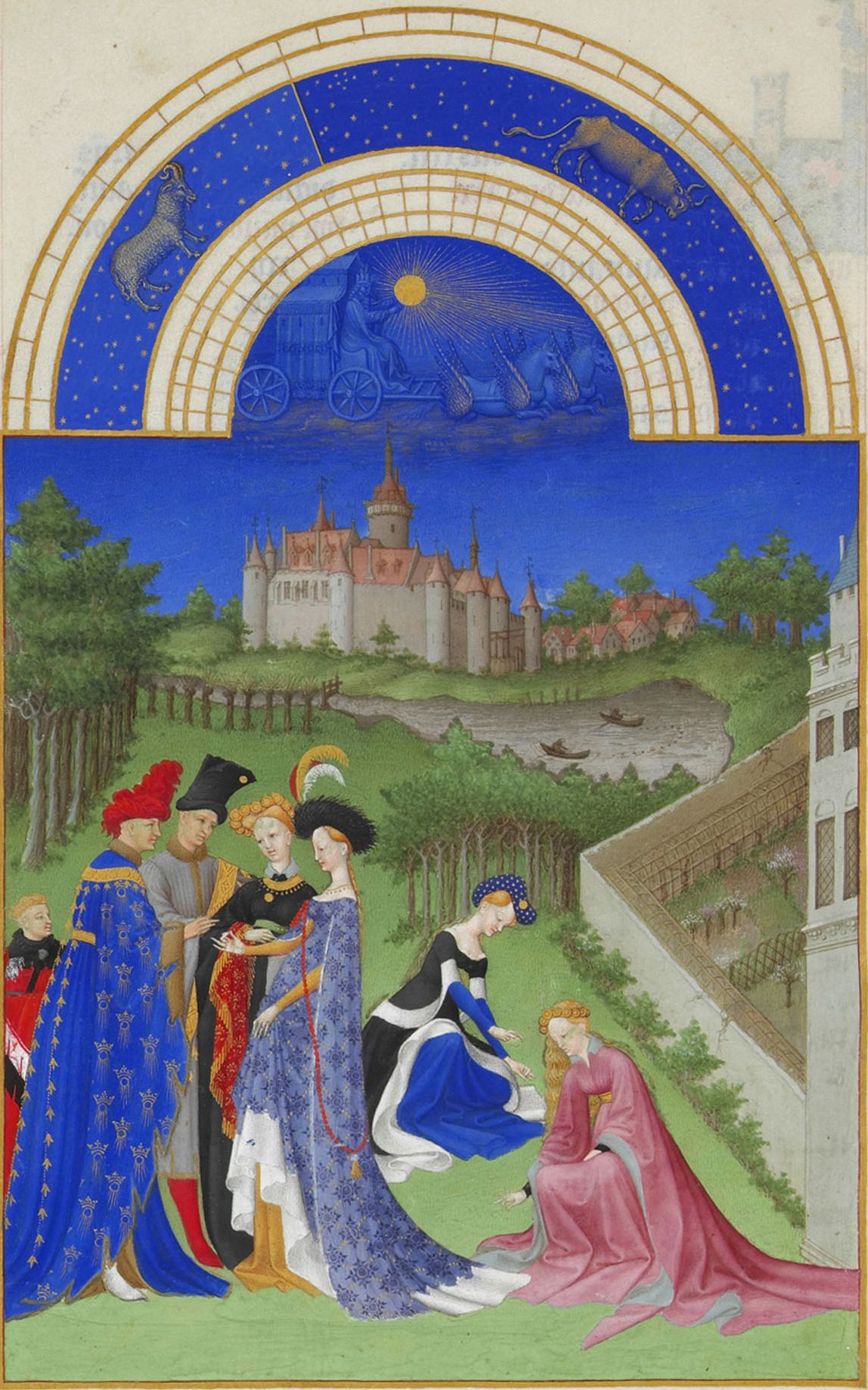
The Chateau de Dourdon as it appeared in 1400, illustrated in Les Très Riches Heures du duc de Berry

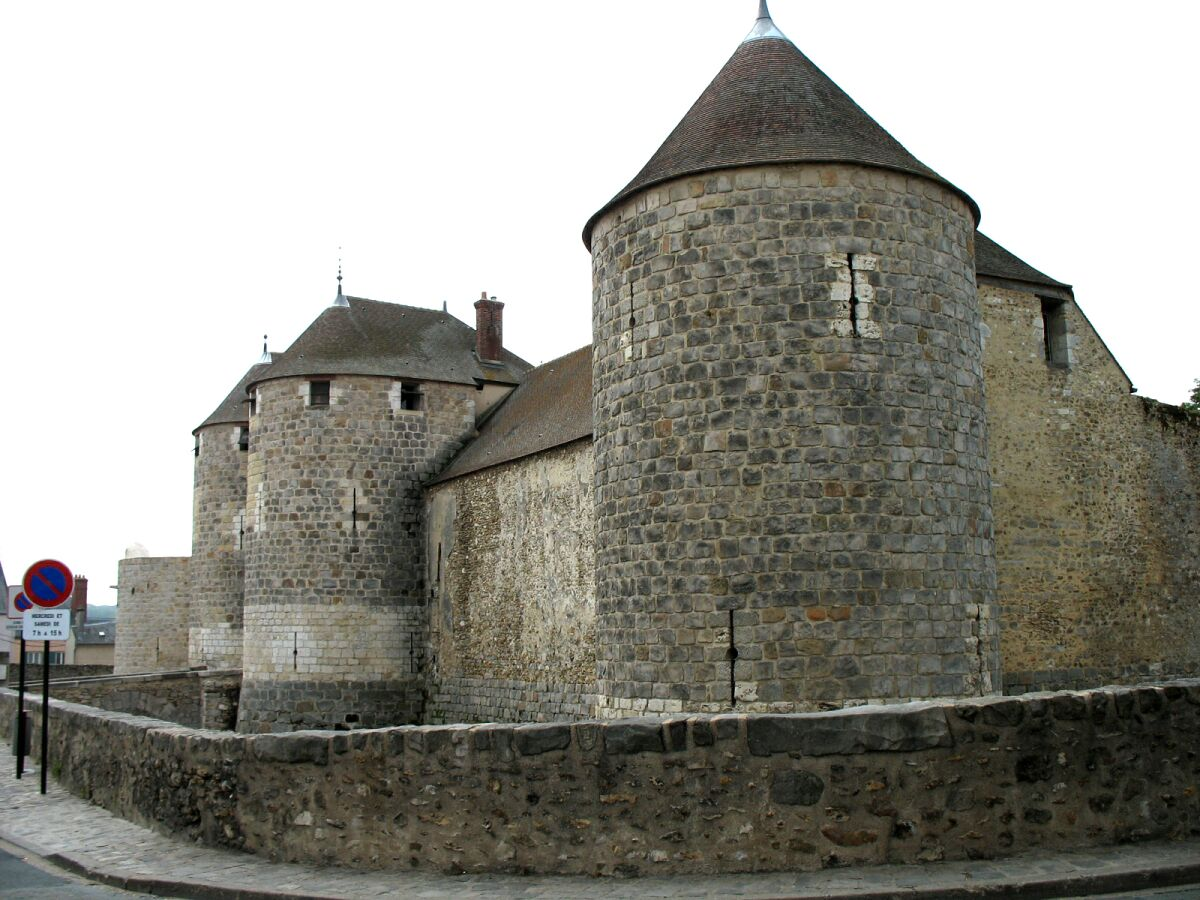
The Château de Dourdan today

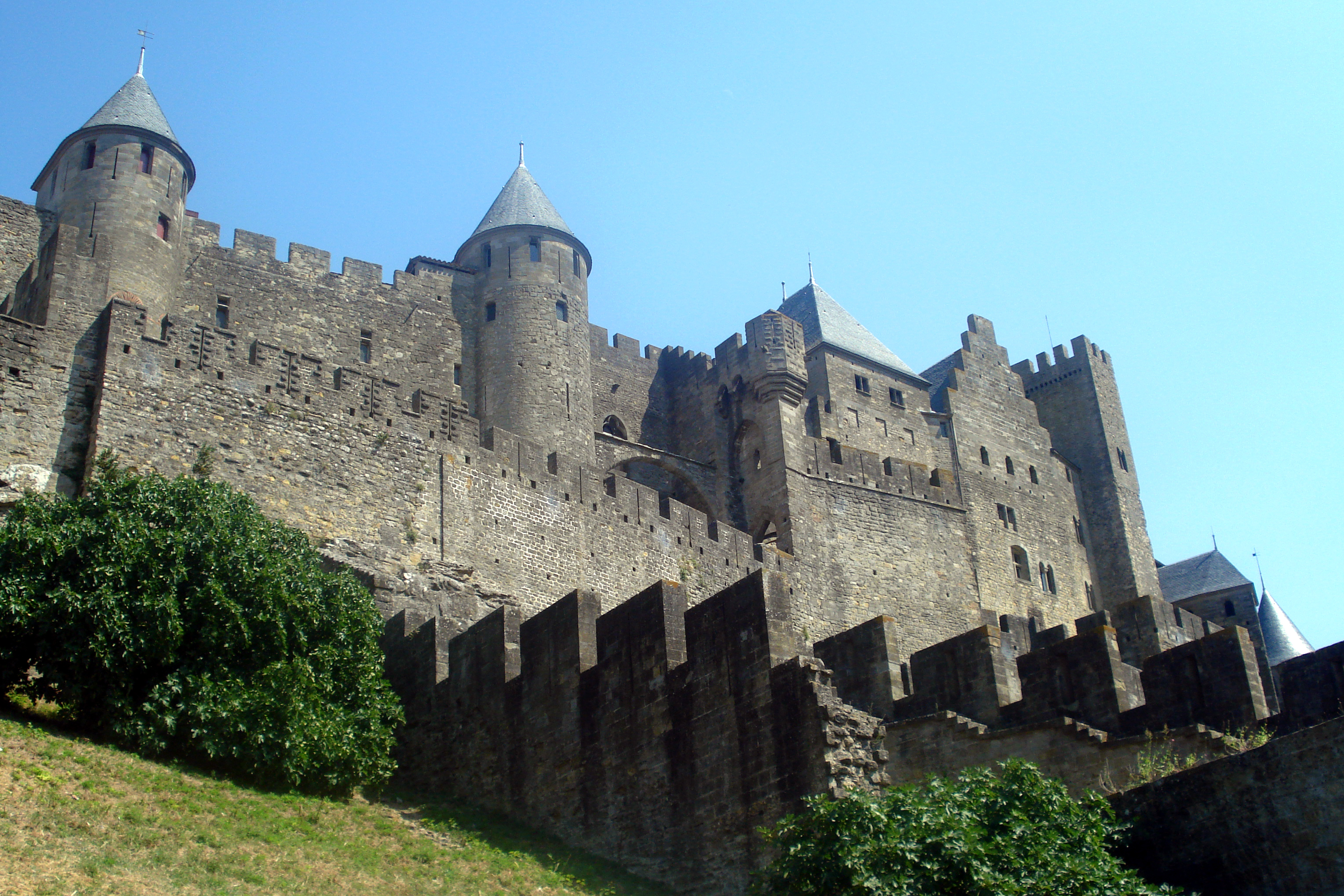
Restored outer walls of the medieval Cité de Carcassonne (13th–14th century)

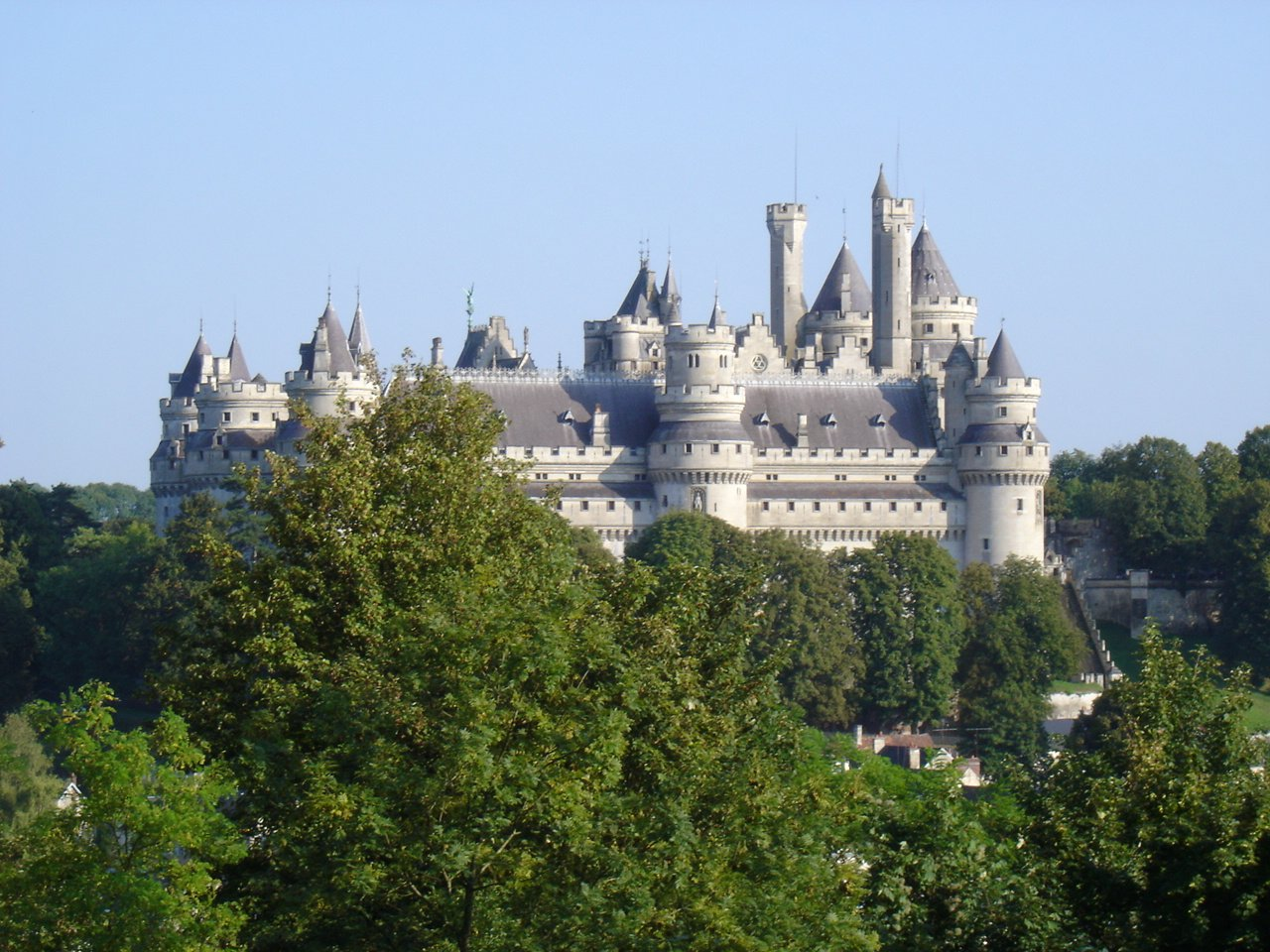
Château de Pierrefonds, 19th-century completion of an unfinished medieval castle by Eugène Viollet-le-Duc

In the 13th century, the design of the chateau fort, or castle, was modified, based on the Byzantine and Moslem castles the French knights had seen during the Crusades. The new kind of fortification was called Phillipienne, after Philippe Auguste, who had taken part in the Crusades. The new fortifications were more geometric, usually square, with a high main donjon or tower, in the center, which could be defended even if the walls of the castle were captured. The donjon of the Château de Vincennes, begun by Philip VI of France, is a good example. It is 52 meters high, the tallest military tower in Europe.

In the Phillipienne castle, other towers, usually round, were placed at the corners and along the walls, close enough together to support each other. The walls had two levels of walkways on the inside, an upper parapet with openings (créneaux) from which soldiers could watch or fire arrows on besiegers below; narrow openings (merlons) through which they could be sheltered as they fired arrows; and floor openings (mâchicoulis), from which they could drop rocks, burning oil or other objects on the besiegers. The upper walls also had protected protruding balconies, échauguettes and bretèches, from which soldiers could see what was happening at the corners or on the ground below. In addition, the towers and walls were pierced with narrow vertical slits, called meurtrières, through which archers could fire arrows. In later castles, the slits took the form of crosses, so that archers could fire arbalètes, or crossbows, in different directions.

Castles were surrounded by deep moats, spanned by a single drawbridge. The entrance was also protected by a portcullis, which could be opened and closed. The walls at the bottom were often sloping, and protected with earthen barriers. A surviving example is the Château de Dourdan in the Seine-et-Marne department, near Nemours.

After the end of the Hundred Years' War (1337–1453), with improvements in artillery, the castles lost most of their military importance. They remained as symbols of the rank of their noble occupants; the narrowing openings in the walls were often widened into the windows of bedchambers and ceremonial halls. The tower of the Chateau of Vincennes became a royal residence.

In the 19th century, portions of the Gothic walls and towers of the Cité de Carcassonne were restored, with some modification, by Eugène Viollet-le-Duc. He also rebuilt the Château de Pierrefonds (1393–1407), an unfinished medieval castle, making it into a neo-Gothic residence for Napoleon III. This project was incomplete when Napoleon III was overthrown in 1870, but can be visited today.

== Restoration and Gothic Revival ==
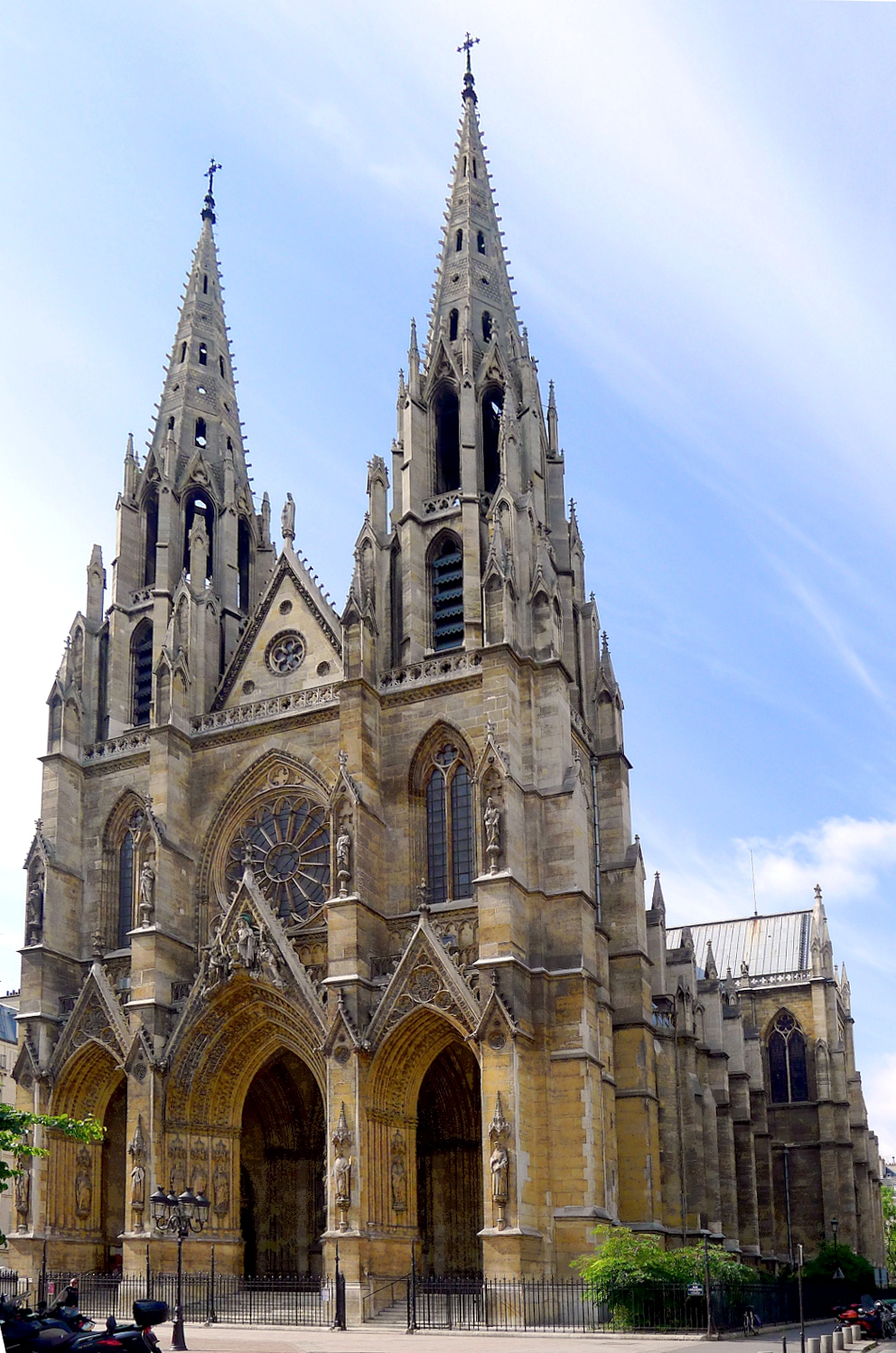
Sainte-Clotilde, Paris, by Théodore Ballu (1841–1857)

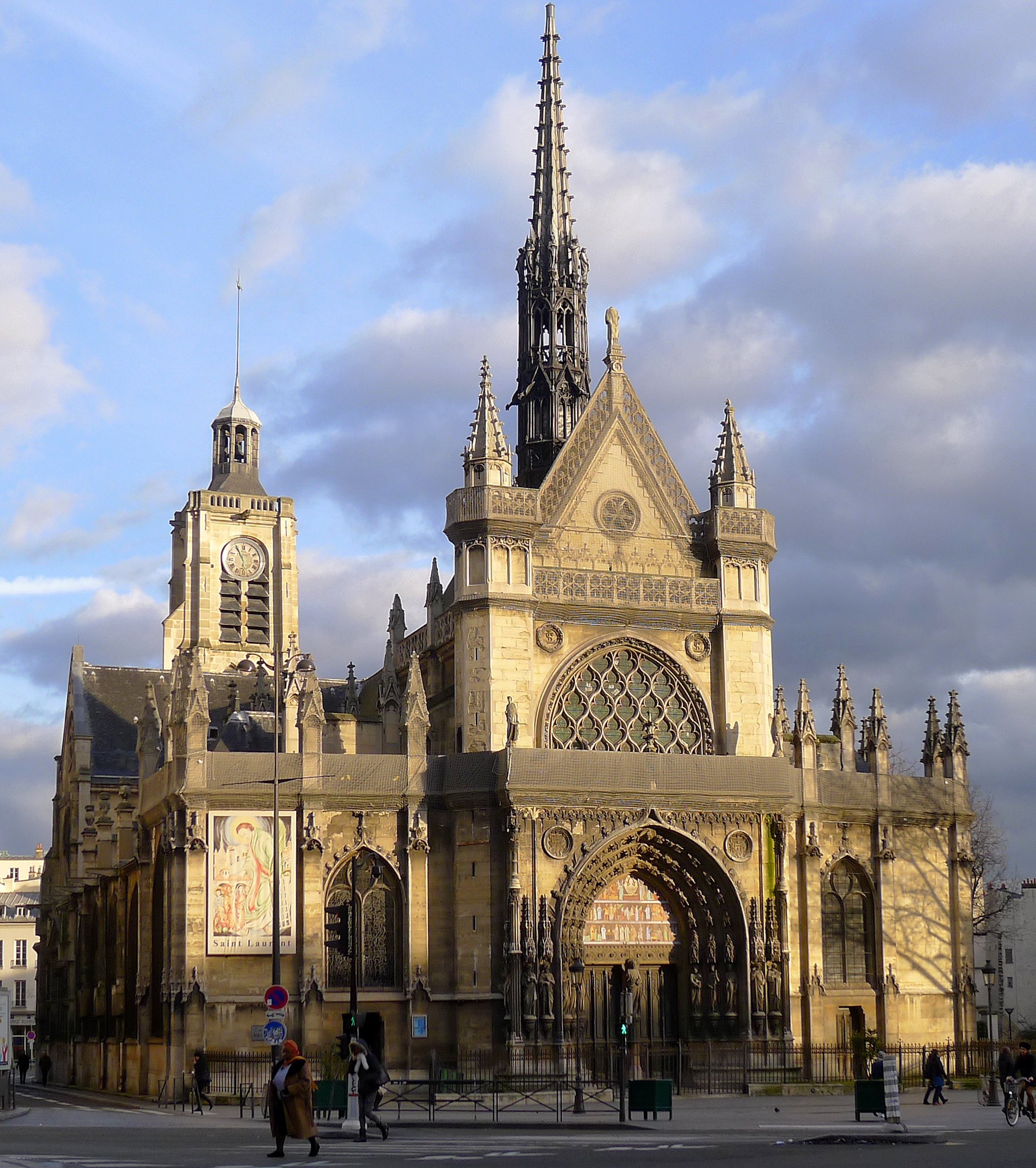
Saint-Laurent, Paris by Simon-Claude-Constant Dufeux (1862–1865).

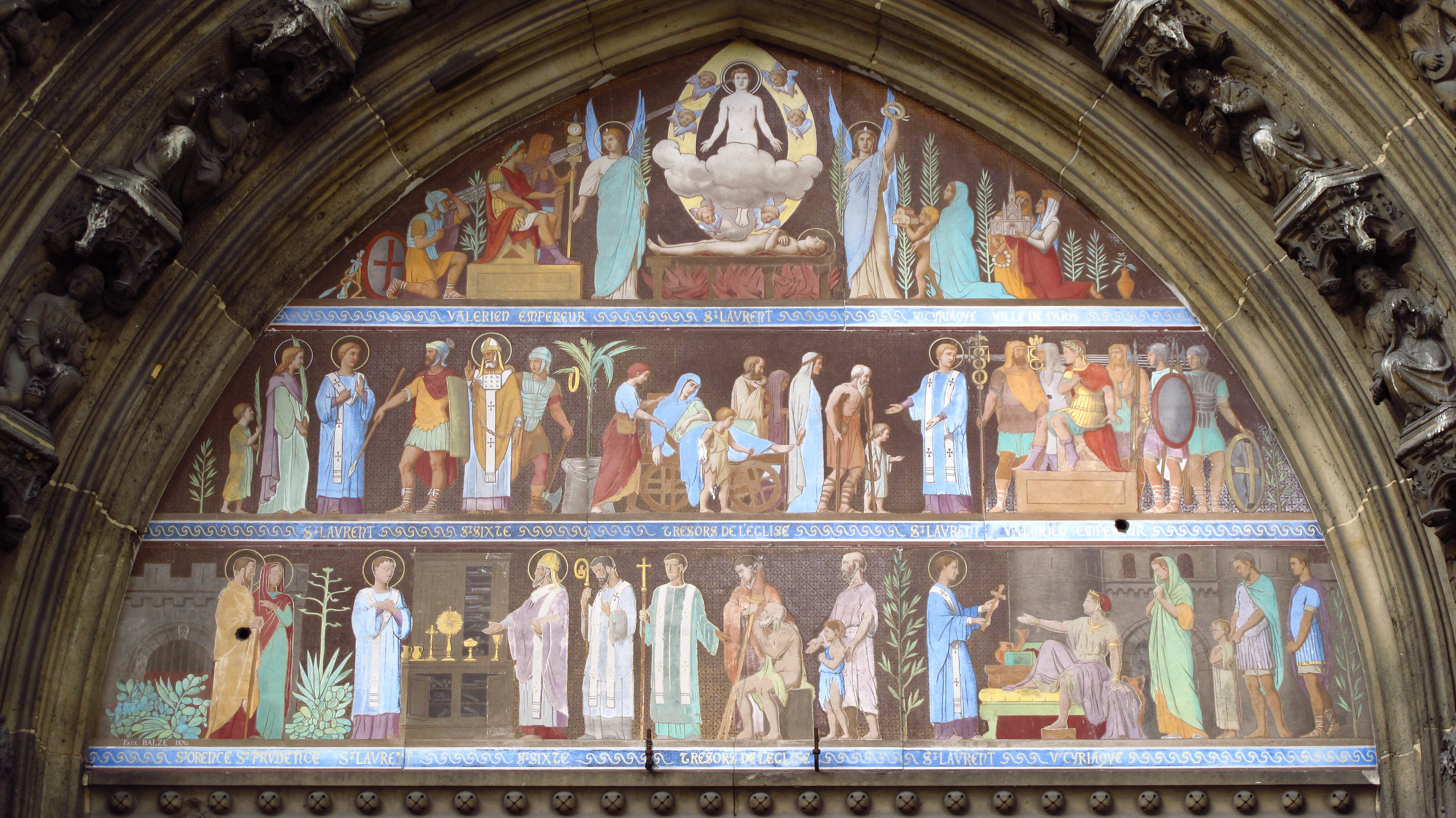
Neo-Gothic fronton of Saint-Laurent, Paris

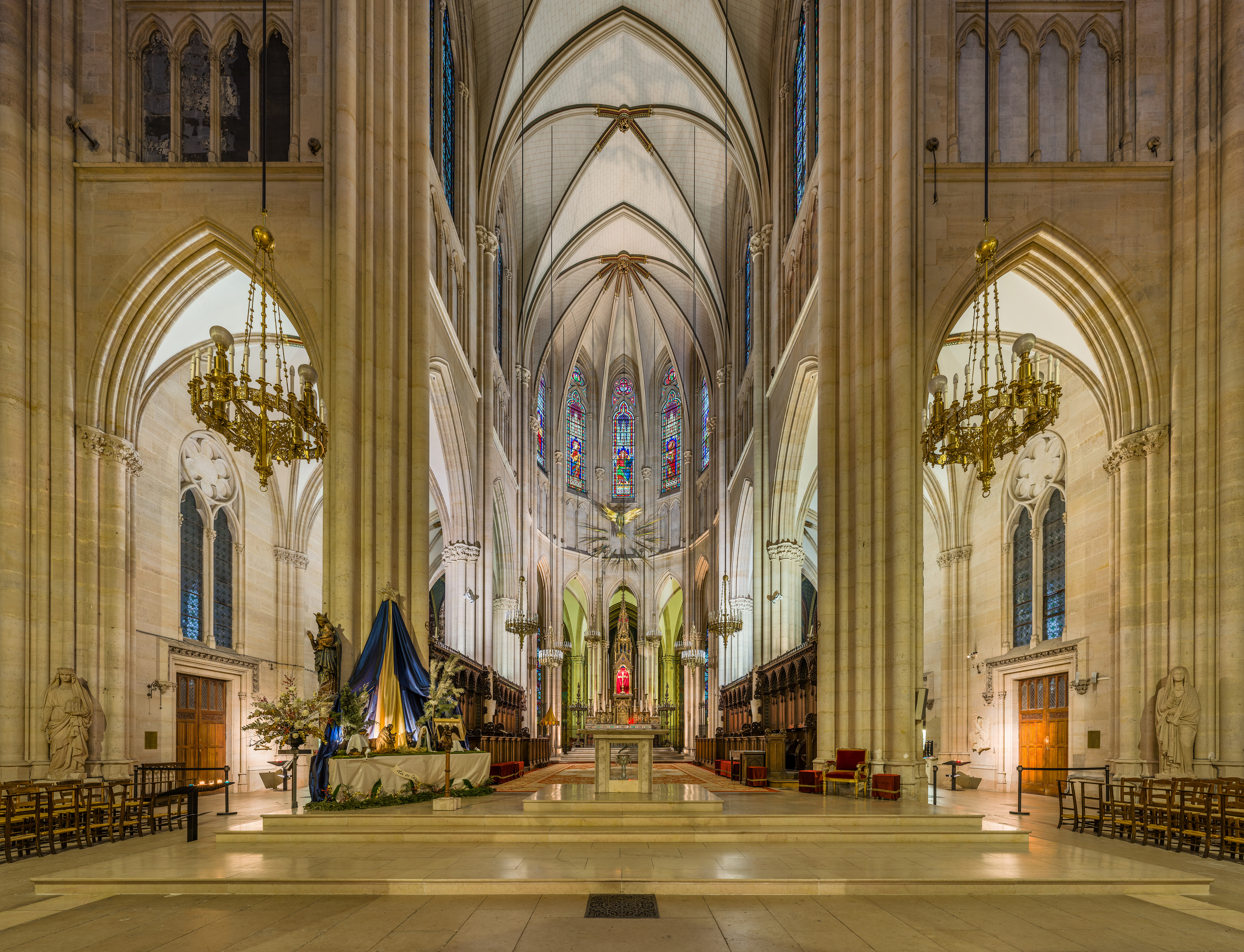
Sanctuary of Basilica of Saint Clotilde, Paris (1862–1865)

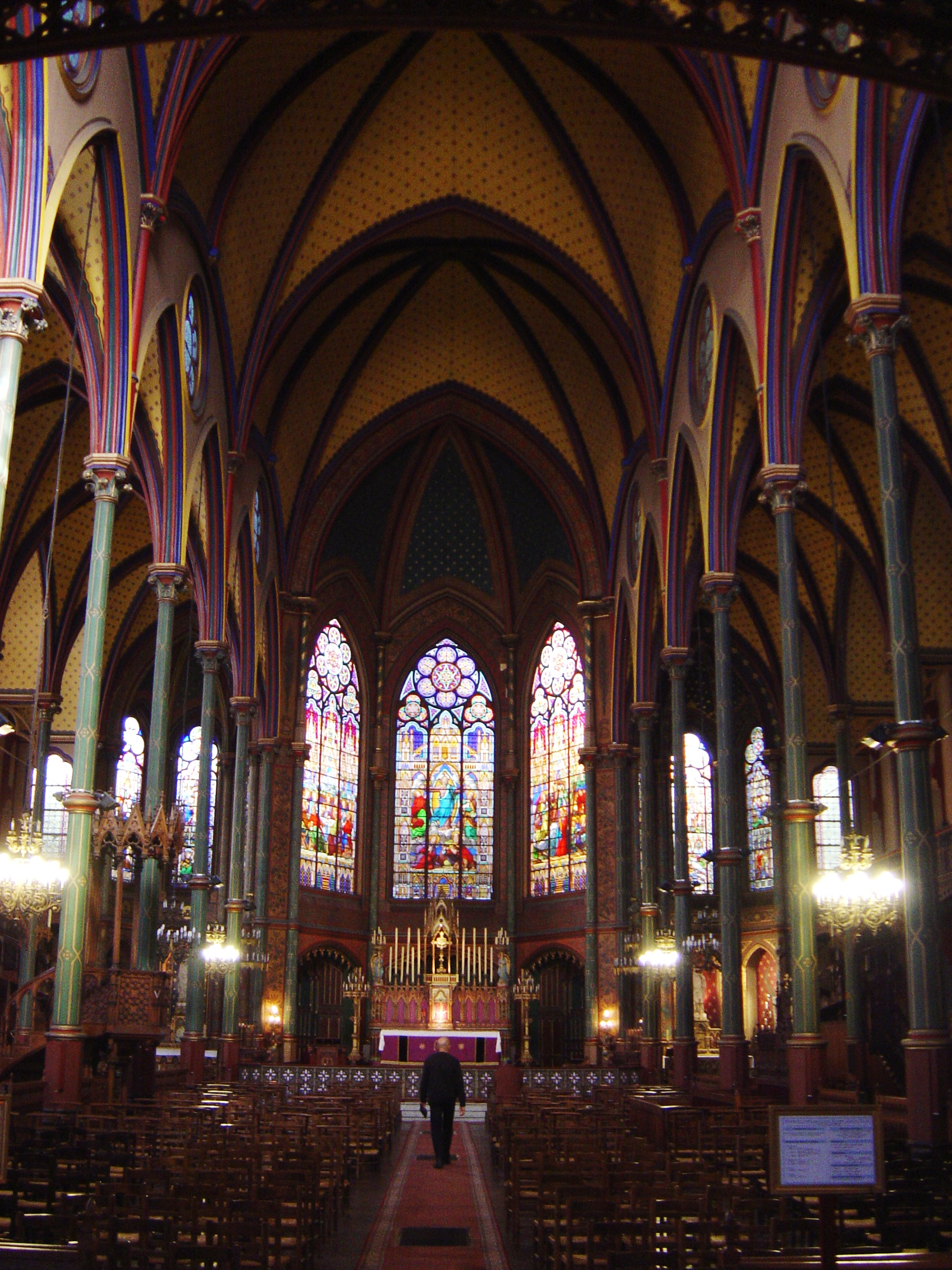
Saint-Eugene-Sainte-Cécile (1854–1855) featured a Gothic design with a modern iron framework

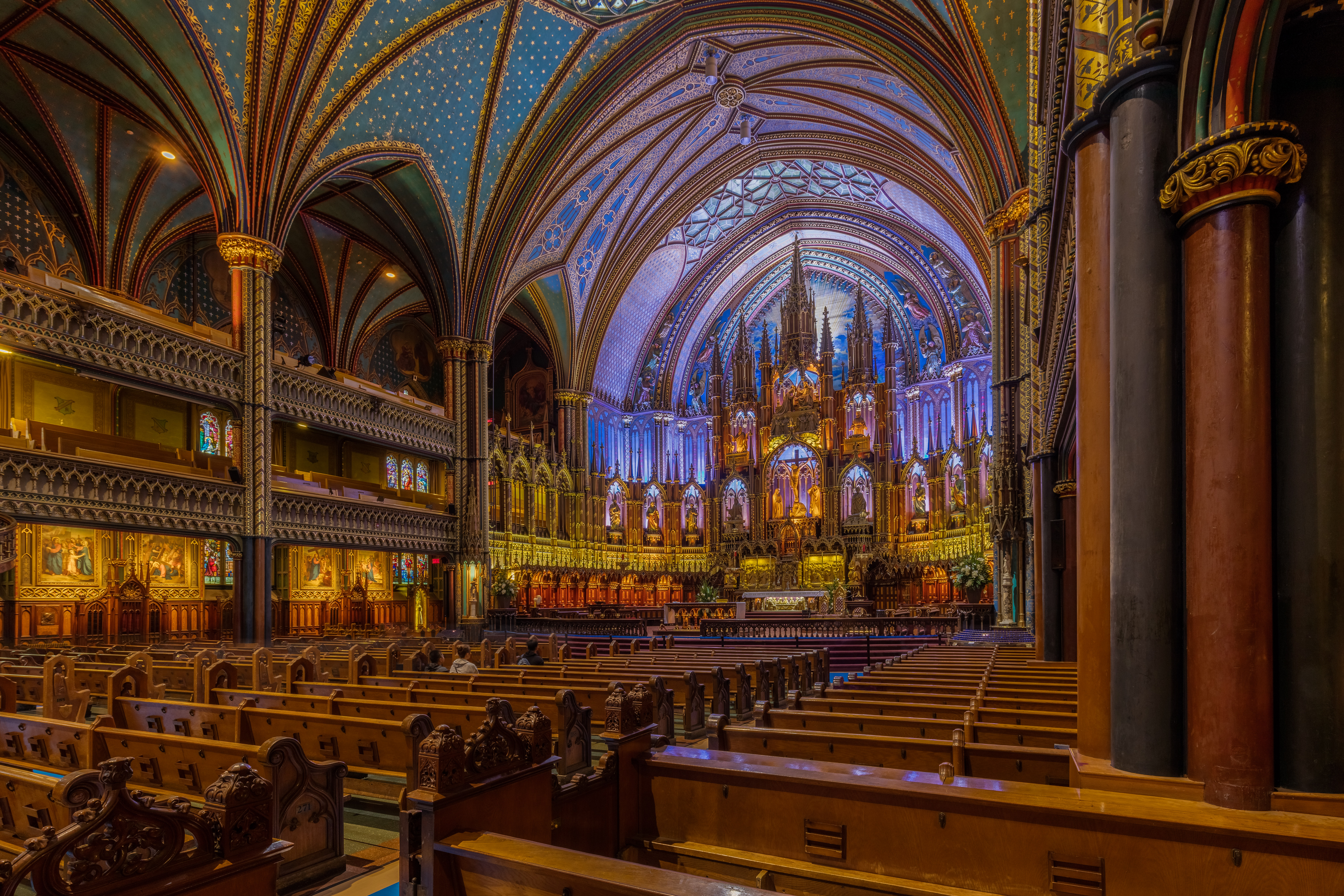
Notre-Dame Basilica, Montreal by James O'Donnell (1823-79). The interior takes inspiration from Sainte-Chapelle in Paris.

A large part of the Gothic architectural heritage of France, particularly the churches and monasteries, had been damaged or destroyed during the Revolution. Of the 300 churches in Paris in the 16th century, only 97 still were standing in 1800. The Basilica of St Denis had been stripped of its stained glass and monumental tombs, while the statues on the façade of the cathedral of Notre-Dame de Paris had been beheaded and taken down. Throughout the country, churches and monasteries had been demolished or turned into barns, cafes, schools, or prisons. The first effort to catalogue the remaining monuments was made in 1816 by Alexandre de Laborde, who wrote the first list of "Monuments of France". In 1831, interest in Gothic architecture grew even greater following the popular success of the romantic novel Notre-Dame de Paris by Victor Hugo. In 1832, Hugo wrote an article for the Revue des deux Mondes, which declared war against the "massacre of ancient stones" and the "demolishers" of France's past. Louis Philippe declared that restoration of churches and other monuments would be a priority of his regime. In October 1830, the position of Inspector of Historical Monuments had been created by the Interior Minister, François Guizot, a professor of history at the Sorbonne. In 1833, Prosper Mérimée became its second Inspector, and by far the most energetic and long-lasting. He held the position for twenty-seven years.

Under Louis Philippe, French Gothic architecture was officially recognized as a treasure of French culture. Under Mérimée's direction, the first efforts to restore major Gothic monuments began. In 1835, the church of Saint Séverin in Paris was among the first to undergo restoration, followed in 1836 by Sainte-Chapelle, which had been turned into a storage house for government archives after the Revolution. The restoration of Saint-Chapelle as led by Félix Duban with Jean-Baptiste Antoine Lassus and a young Eugène Viollet-le-Duc. In 1843, Lassus and Viollet-le-Duc won the competition for the restoration of Notre-Dame de Paris. Over the rest of the 19th century, all of the major Gothic cathedrals of France underwent extensive restoration.

French Gothic architecture also experienced a modest revival, largely confined to new churches. Neo-Gothic churches built in Paris included Sainte-Clothilde by Theodore Ballu (1841–1857), and Saint-Laurent, Paris by Simon-Claude-Constant Dufeux (1862–1865). Jean-Baptiste Lassus became the most prolific neo-Gothic architect in France, constructing Saint-Nicolas de Nantes (1840), Sacré-Coeur de Moulins (1849), Saint-Pierre de Dijon (1850),Saint-Jean-Baptiste de Belleville (1853) and the Église de Cusset (1855). The Saint-Eugene-Sainte-Cécile in Paris by Louis-Auguste Boileau and Adrien-Louis Lasson (1854–1855) was the most innovative example of neo-Gothic; it combined a traditional Gothic design with a modern iron framework. Jules Verne was married in the church in 1857. The French Gothic tradition also influenced churches in Canada, such as the Notre-Dame Basilica in Montreal (which consciously took inspiration from the Sainte-Chapelle in Paris) and the Basilica of Our Lady Immaculate in Guelph.

== Characteristics ==
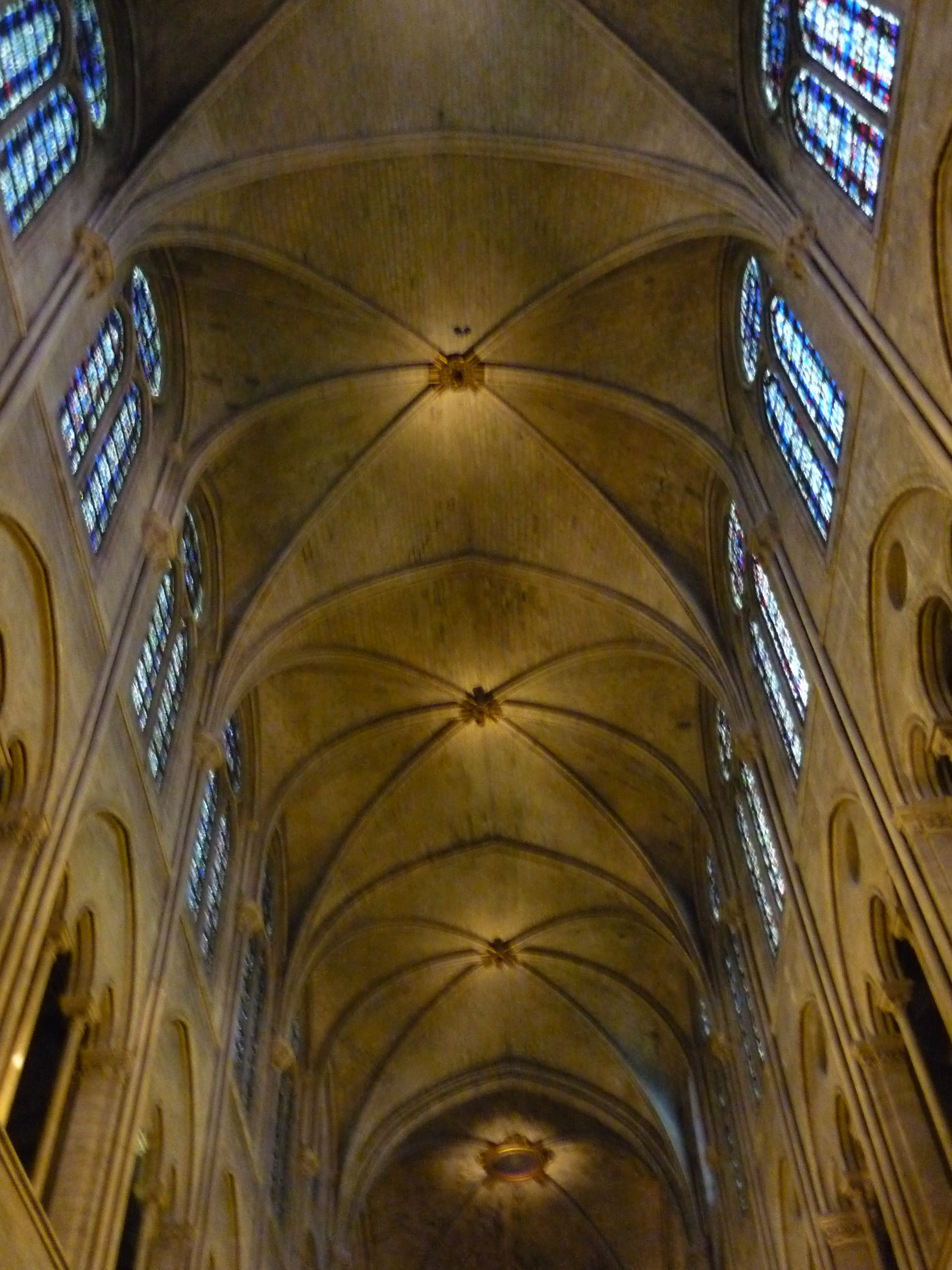
Six-part rib vaults of ceiling of Notre-Dame Cathedral

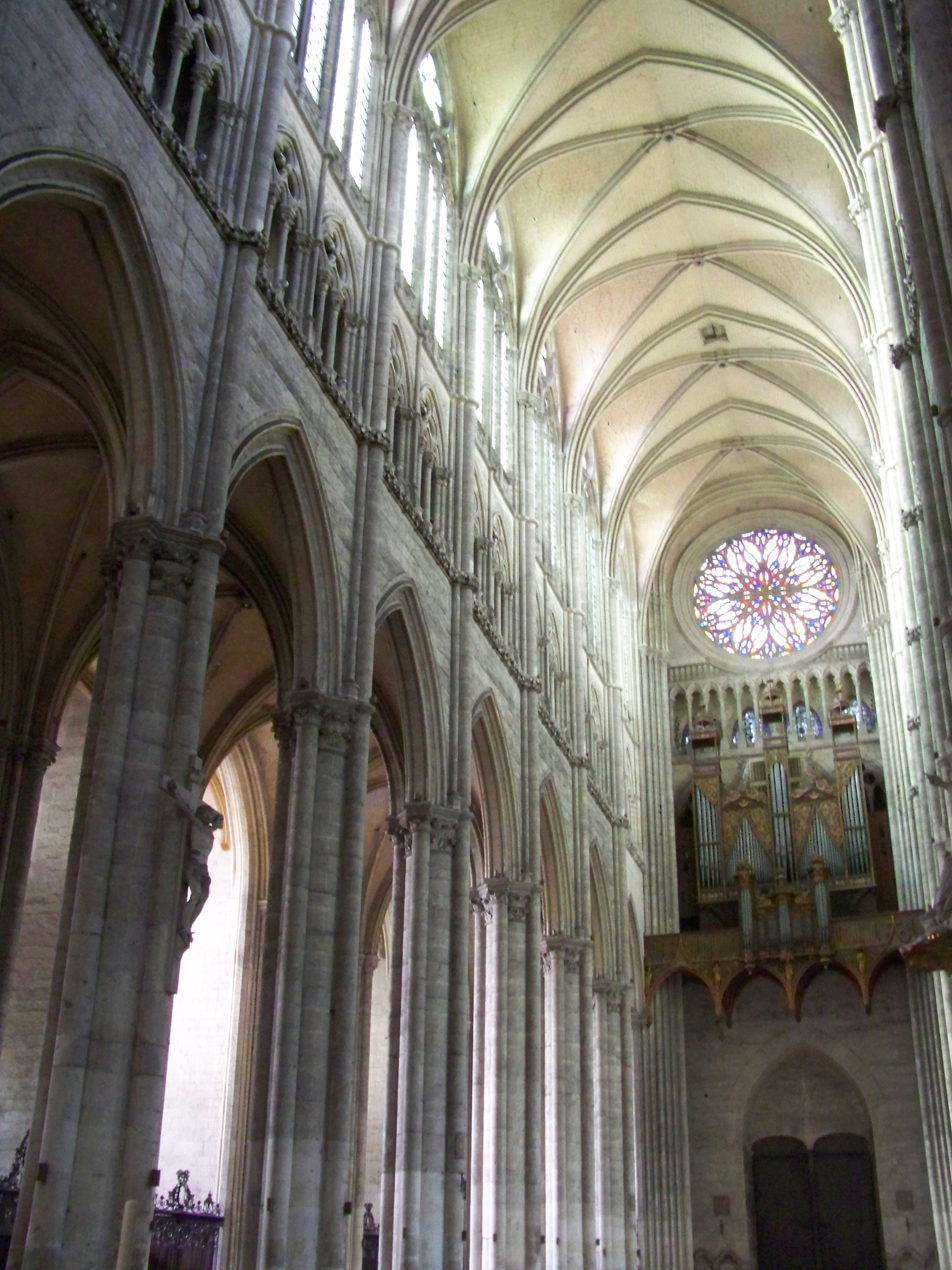
Four-part rib vaults at Amiens Cathedral allowed greater height and larger windows

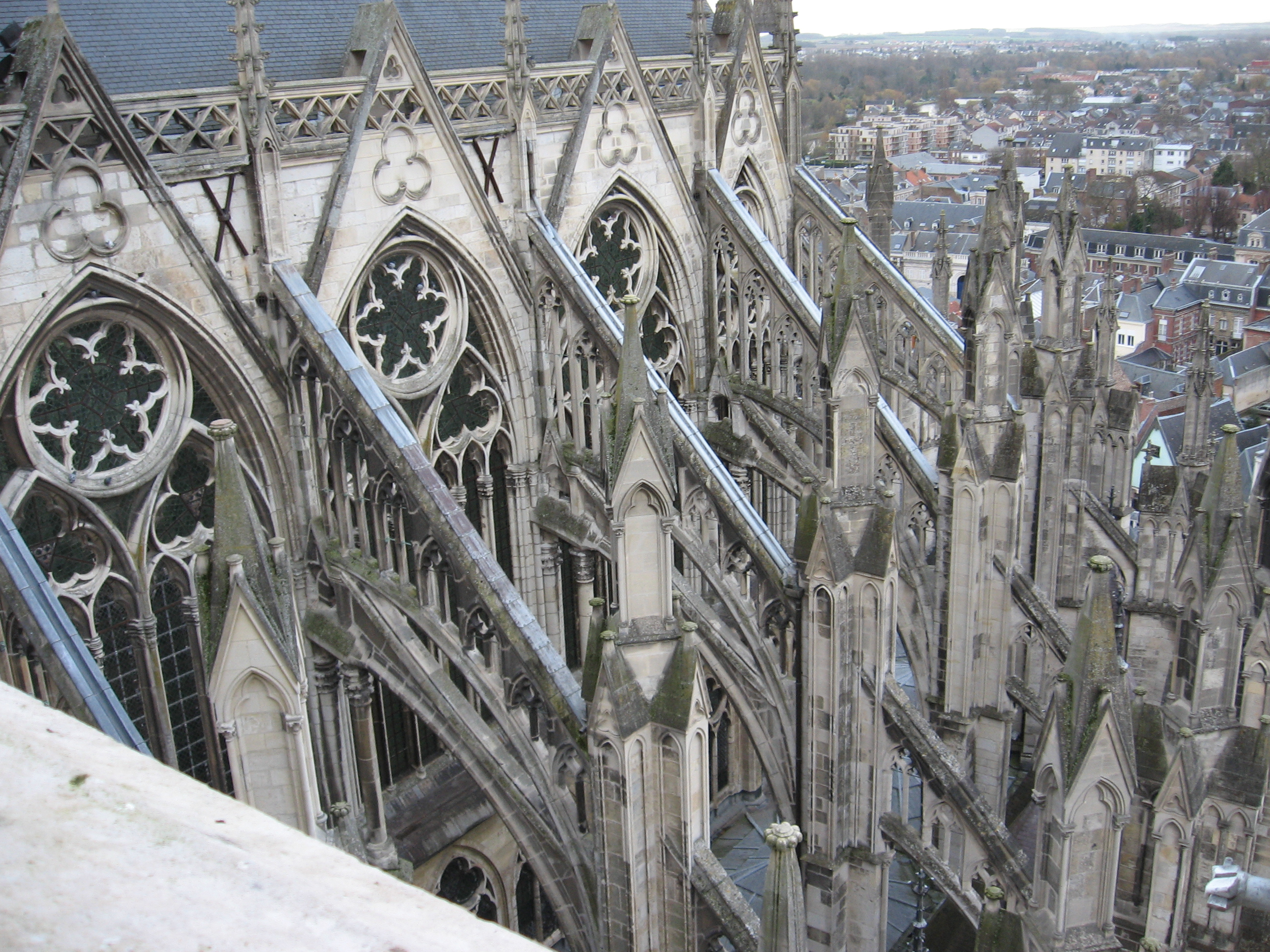
Flying buttresses of Amiens Cathedral. Pinnacles atop the buttresses added decoration and additional weight to strengthen the building

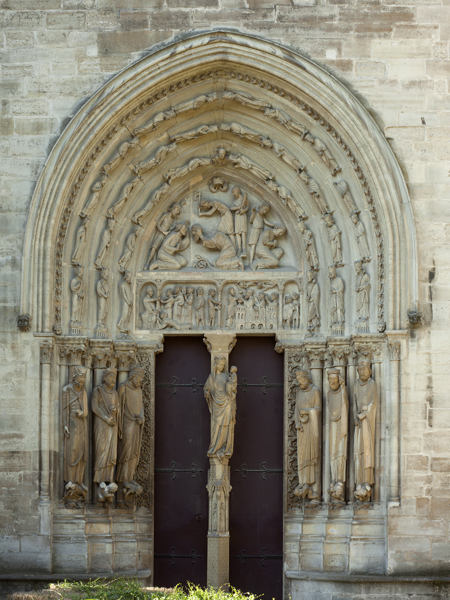
North portal of Basilica of St Denis, with early tympanum and columns made of elongated figures

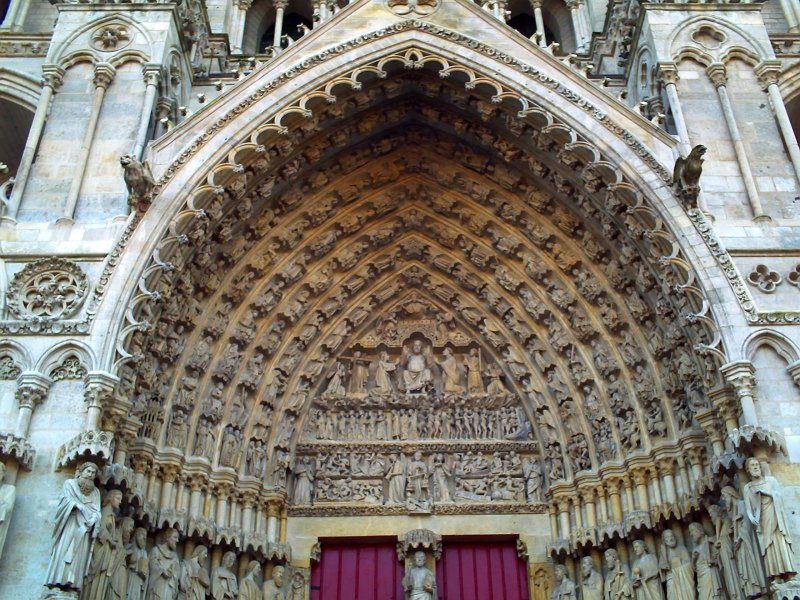
Day of Judgement Tympanum at Amiens Cathedral

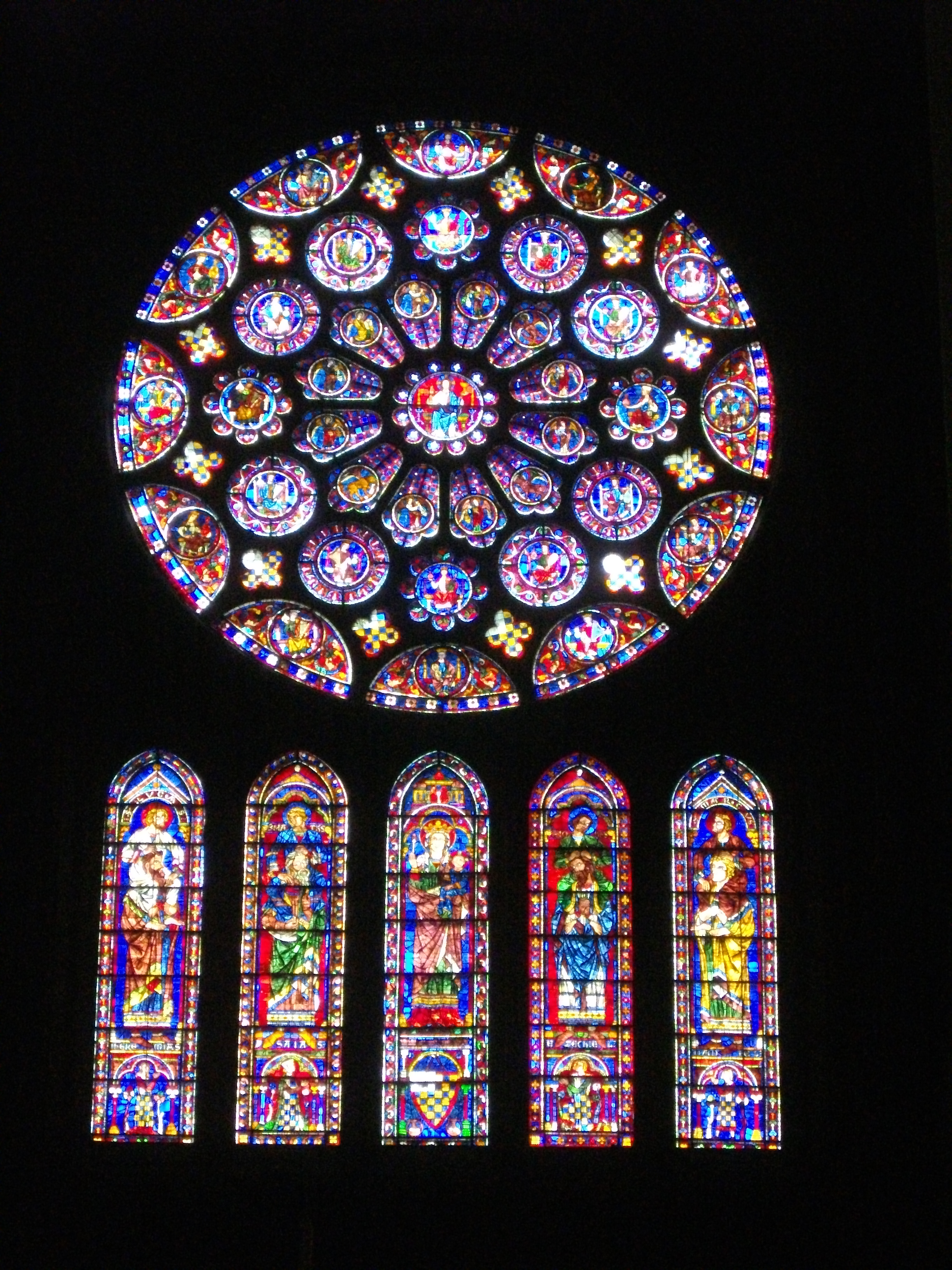
Rose window in Chartres Cathedral

=== The rib vault ===
The Gothic style emerged from innovative use of existing technologies, particularly the pointed arch and the rib vault. The rib vault was known in the earlier Romanesque period, but it was not widely or effectively used until the Gothic period. The crossed ribs of the vault carried the weight outwards and downwards, to clusters of supporting pillars and columns. The earlier rib vaults, used at Sens Cathedral and Notre-Dame Cathedral, had six compartments bordered by ribs and the crossing arch, which transferred the weight to alternating columns and pillars. A new innovation appeared during the High Gothic: the four-part rib vault, which was used in Chartres Cathedral, Amiens Cathedral and Reims Cathedral. The ribs of this vault distributed the weight more equally to the four supporting pillars below and established a closer connection between the nave and the lower portions of the church walls, and between the arcades below and the windows above. This allowed for greater height and thinner walls and contributed to the strong impression of verticality given by the newer Cathedrals.

=== The flying buttress ===
The second major innovation of the Gothic style was the flying buttress, which was first used at Notre-Dame Cathedral. This transferred the thrust of the weight of the roof outside the walls, where it was countered by the weight of the buttress. Heavy stone pinnacles were added to the top of the buttresses, to precisely counterbalance the thrust from inside the walls. The buttress allowed a significant reduction in the thickness of the cathedral walls, and permitted the use of larger windows in the interior of the church. In churches such as Sainte Chapelle, due to buttresses, the walls were made almost entirely of stained glass.

The development of rib-vaults and buttresses brought gradual changes to the interior structure of cathedrals. Early Gothic cathedrals had the walls of the nave built in four levels: a gallery with columns on the ground level; then the tribune, a gallery with windows; then the triforium, a row of smaller windows; and finally the high windows, just below the vaults. During the High Gothic period, with the development of the four-part rib vault and the flying buttress, the tribune was eliminated at Chartres and other new cathedrals, allowing taller windows and arcades. By the 15th century, at Rouen Cathedral, the triforium also disappeared, and the walls between the traverses were filled with high windows.

=== The portal and tympanum ===
Another innovative feature of the French Gothic cathedral was the design of the portal or entry, which by long Christian tradition faced west. The Basilica of St Denis had a triple portal, decorated with columns in the form of statues of apostles and saints around the doorways, and biblical scenes crowded with statuary over the doorways. This triple portal was adopted by all the major cathedrals. A tympanum over the portal, crowded with sculptural figures illustrating a biblical story became a feature of Gothic cathedrals. Following the example of Amiens, the tympanum over the central portal traditionally depicted the Last Judgement, the right portal showed the coronation of the Virgin Mary, and the left portal showed the lives of saints who were important in the diocese.

=== Stained glass and the rose window ===
Large stained glass windows and rose windows were another defining feature of the Gothic style. Some Gothic windows, like those at Chartres, were cut into the stone walls. Other windows, such as those in the chapels of Notre-Dame and Reims, were in stone frames installed into the walls. The most common form was an oculus, a small round window with two lancets, or windows with pointed arches, just below it. The rose window was the most famous type of the Gothic style. They were placed in the transepts and the portals to provide light to the nave. The largest rose windows were ten meters in diameter. They had a framework of stone armatures often in an ornate floral pattern, to help them resist the wind. Gothic windows were in a stone frame separate from the wall, not cut into the wall.

The early windows were made of pieces of tinted glass, touched up with grisaille painting, and held in place by pieces of lead that outlined the figures. As the windows grew larger, more intense colors were used. After 1260, the colors became lighter, and the combination of grisaille and pale shades of yellow became more common. Chartres Cathedral and Le Mans Cathedral have some of the finest surviving original windows.

== Sculpture and symbolism - the "Book for the Poor" ==
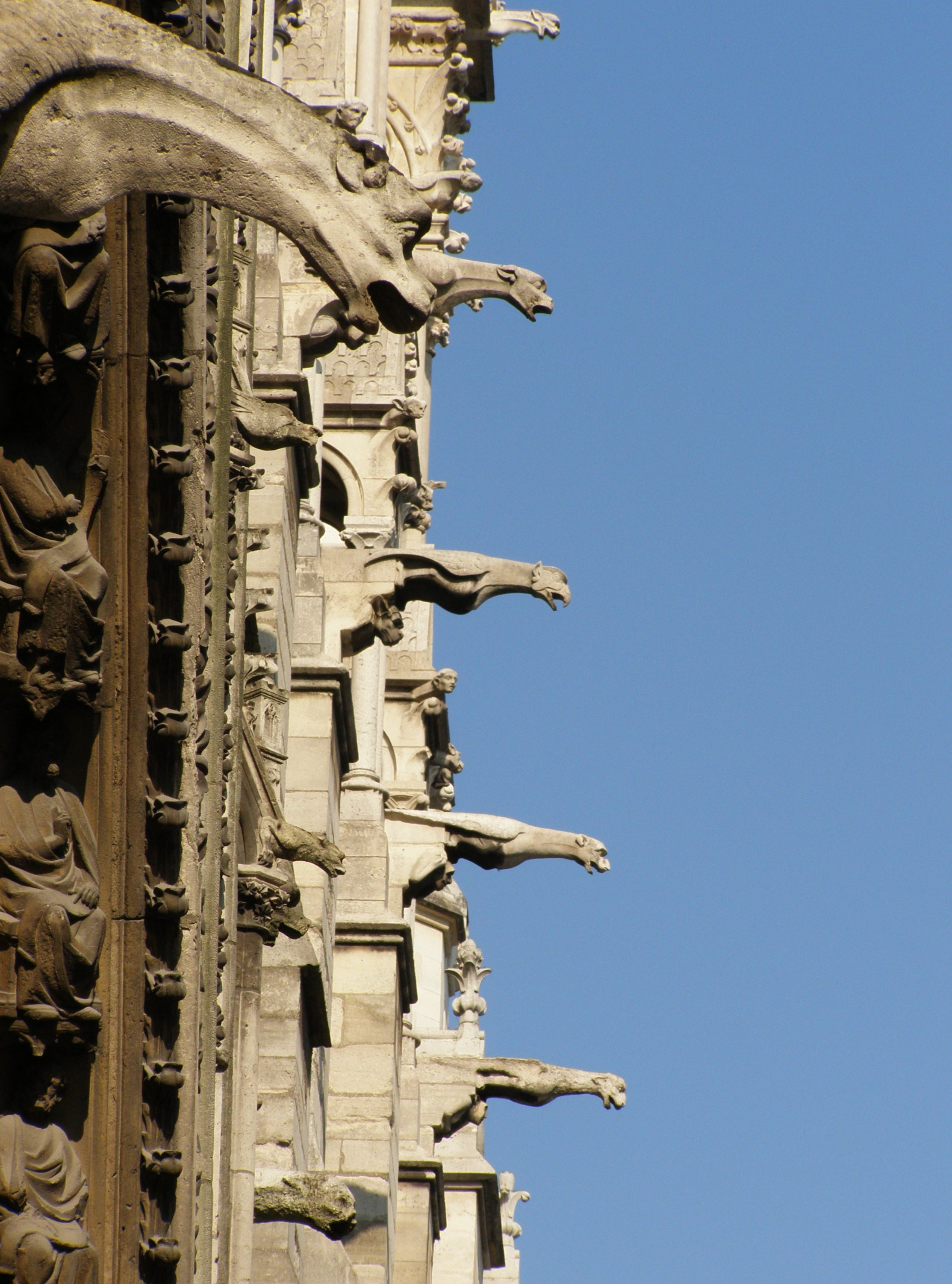
Gargoyles on the facade of Notre Dame de Paris

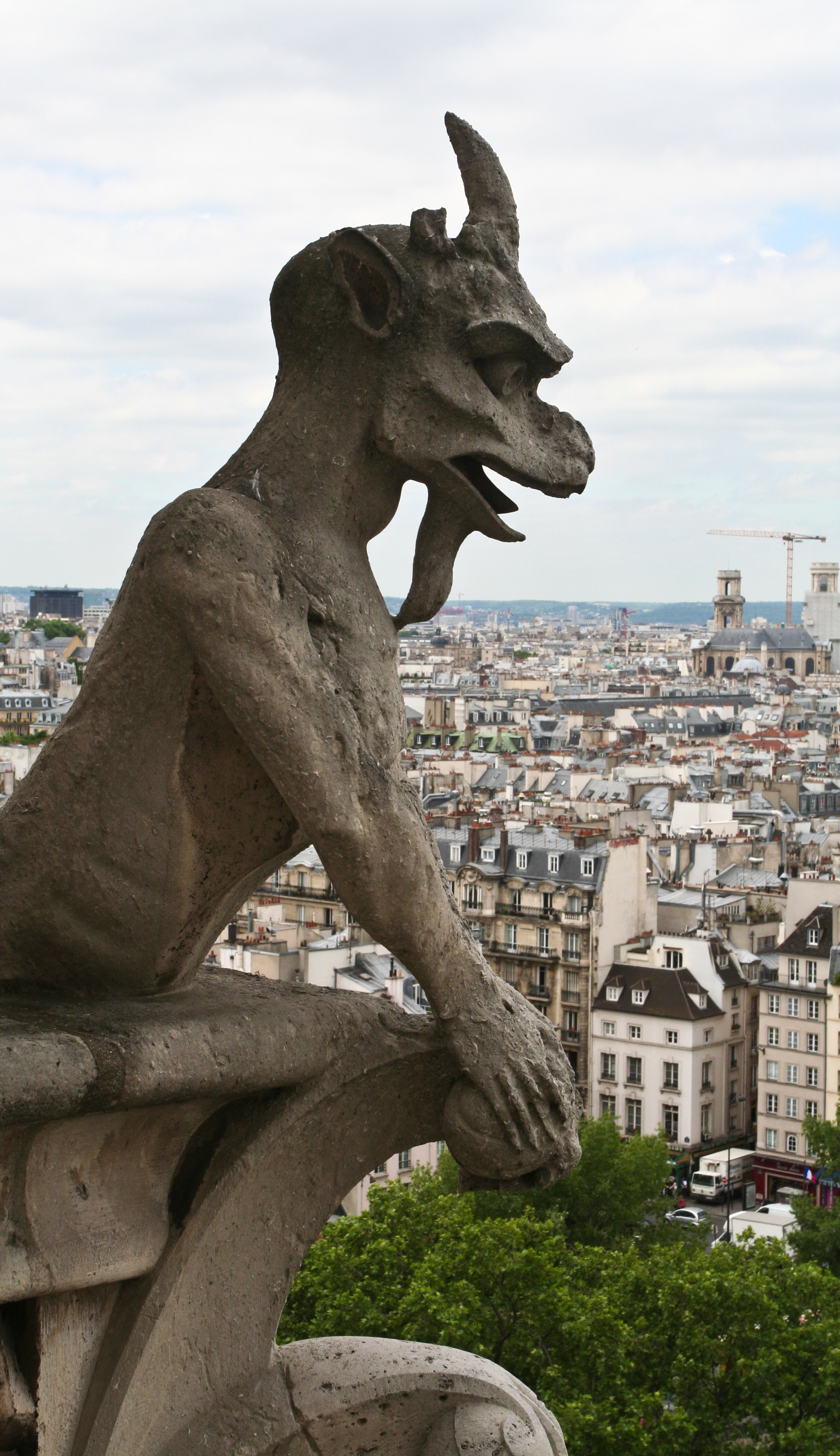
Chimera on the roof of Notre Dame de Paris

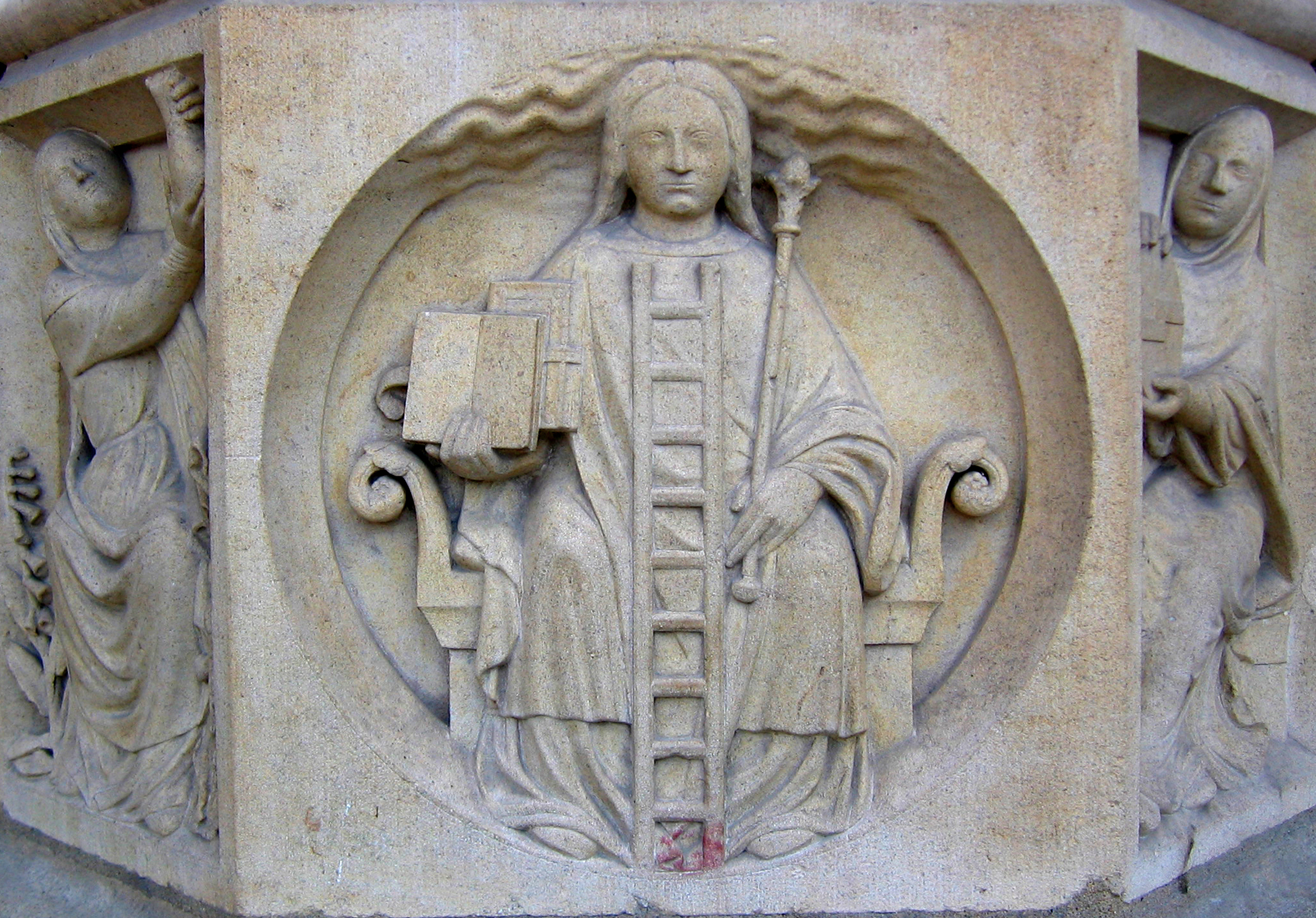
Allegory of alchemy, central portal, Notre Dame de Paris

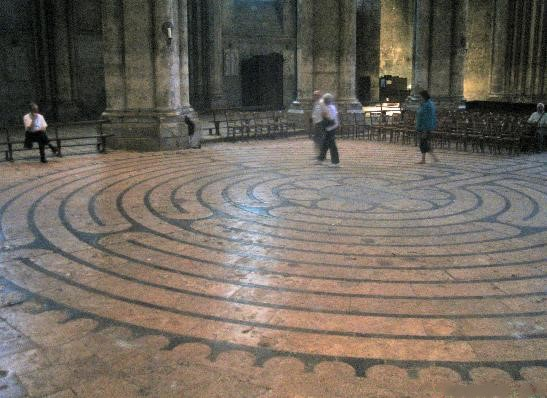
Labyrinth of Chartres Cathedral

A Gothic cathedral functioned as a liber pauperum, literally a "book of the poor", furnished with sculpture illustrating biblical stories for the vast majority of parishioners who were illiterate. These largely illustrated stories from the Bible, but also included stories and figures from mythology and more complicated artistic symbols taken from medieval philosophical and scientific teachings (such as alchemy).

The exteriors of cathedrals and other Gothic churches were decorated with sculptures of a variety of fabulous and frightening grotesques or monsters. These included the gargoyle, the chimera, the dragon, the tarasque, and others, taken largely from legend and mythology. They formed part of the visual message for the illiterate worshippers, providing symbols of the evil and danger that threatened those who did not follow the teachings of the church.

Gargoyles also had a more practical purpose. They served as the rain spouts of the building; rainwater ran from the roof into lead gutters, then down channels on the flying buttresses to the mouths of the gargoyles. The longer the gargoyle, the further they projected water away from the walls, thus protecting walls and windows from water-damage. Multiple numbers were used to distribute the water as widely as possible.

Amid all the religious figures, some of the sculptural decoration was devoted to illustrating medieval science and philosophy. The porch of Notre-Dame Cathedral in Paris and of Amiens Cathedral are decorated with similar small carved figures holding circular plaques with symbols of transformation taken from alchemy. The central pillar of the central door of Notre-Dame features a statue of a woman on a throne holding a sceptre in her left hand, and in her right hand, two books, one open (symbol of public knowledge), and the other closed (esoteric knowledge), along with a ladder with seven steps, symbolizing the seven steps which alchemists followed in their quest of trying to transform ordinary metal into gold.

Another common feature of Gothic cathedrals was a design of a labyrinth, usually found in stone on the floor in a central part of the cathedral. Inspired by the labyrinth in Greek legend constructed by King Minos as the home of the Minotaur, in cathedrals labyrinths were known as the "Path of Jerusalem" and symbolized the difficult and often roundabout path that a Christian sometimes had to follow in order to reach the gates of Paradise and salvation. Large labyrinths originally found in Auxerre Cathedral, Sens Cathedral, Reims Cathedral, and Arras Cathedral were removed during various renovations in the 18th century. The best surviving examples are in Chartres Cathedral, in its original form, and in Amiens Cathedral, which was reconstructed in 1894.

The portal sculpture of Burgundy integrates classical literary elements with its 13th-century Gothic style. In Auxerre, the cathedral of Saint-Étienne features two such examples of sculptures depicting Hercules, a satyr, and a sleeping faun; the Chartres–Reims cathedral's north transept illustrates the biblical tale of David and Bathsheba. The Sens Cathedral's "Coronation of the Virgin" reflects a similar relief on the Notre Dame in Paris; it came from a workshop that made minor contributions to Spanish Gothic architecture.

== Timeline of notable buildings ==
Because of the lengthy period of construction of Gothic cathedrals, few were built in a single style. Most, like Notre-Dame, have a combination of features constructed in several different periods, as well as features constructed after the Gothic age. Also, different sources give varying dates for time periods. This list primarily uses the time periods given in LaRousse encyclopedia on-line and the on-line Pedagogical Dossier of Gothic Architecture of the Cité de l'Architecture et du Patrimoine, Paris.

=== Early Gothic, Transition, or Primitive Gothic (1130–1180) ===
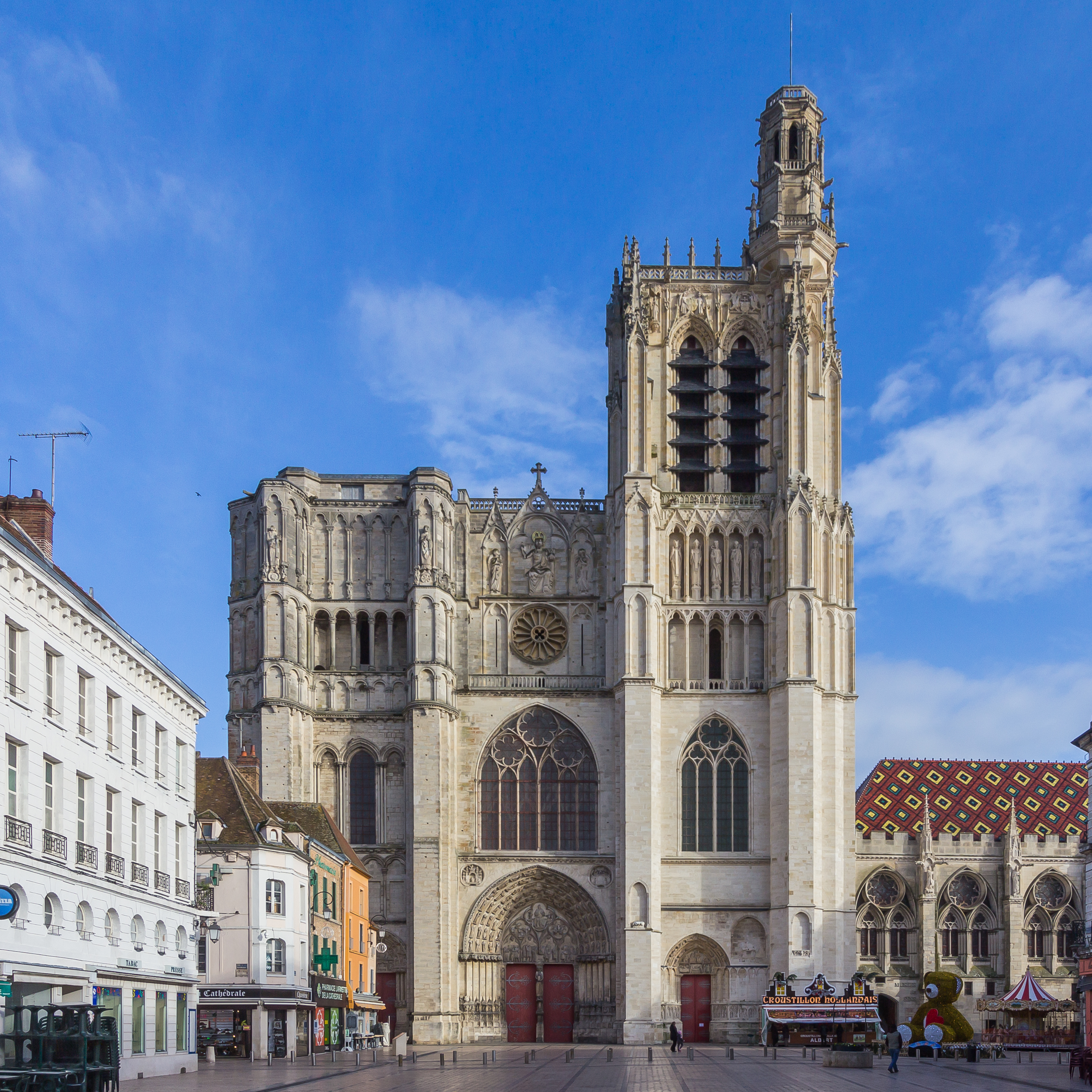
Sens Cathedral (1135–1171)

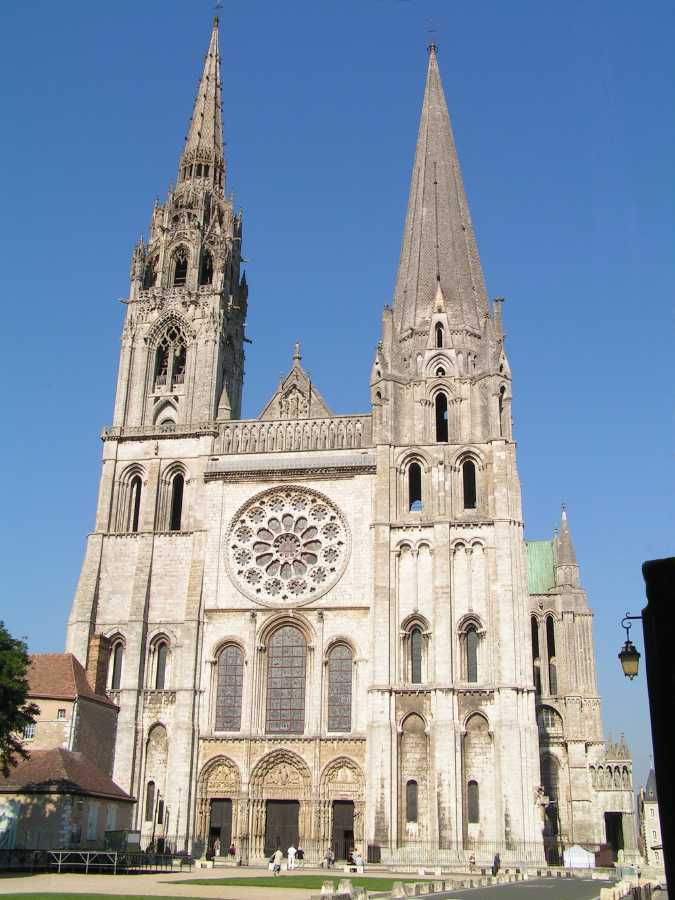
Chartres Cathedral (1194–1260)

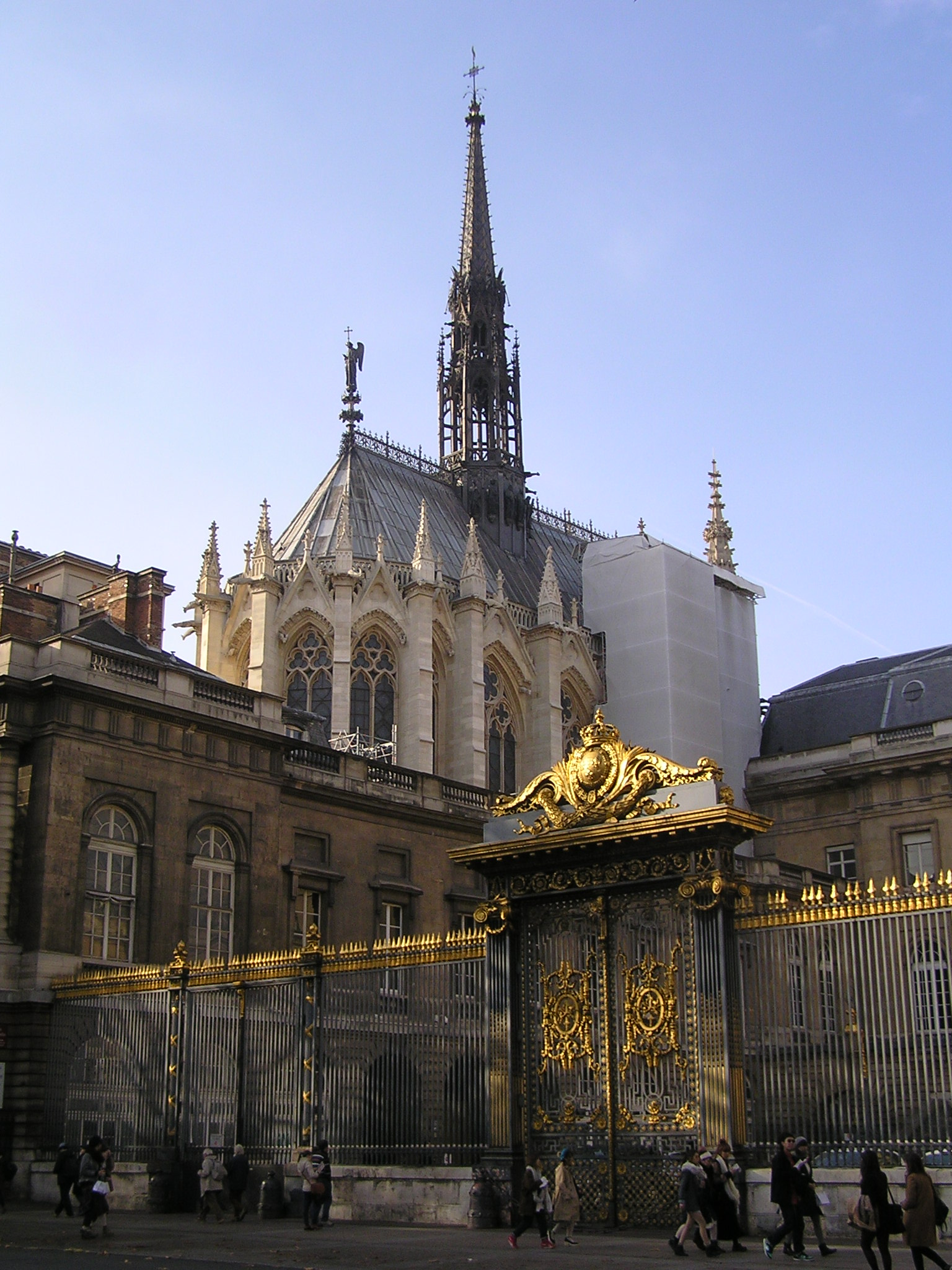
Sainte Chapelle (1238–1248)

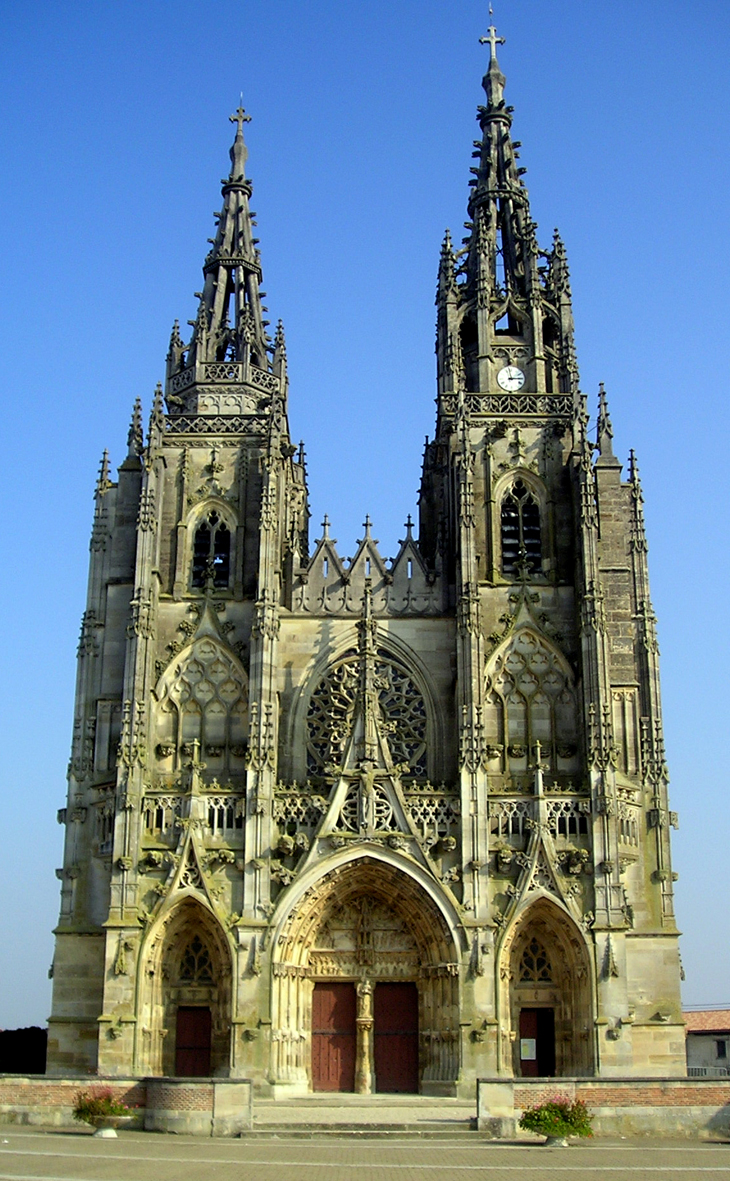
Basilique Notre-Dame de l'Epine

- 1130: Sens Cathedral, the first French Gothic cathedral, begun (consecrated 1171).
- 1135: Basilica of Saint-Denis reconstruction in new style begun by Abbot Suger, The Gothic ambulatory was finished in 1144.
- 1145: Rouen Cathedral begun. (consecrated 1237)
- 1150: Noyon Cathedral begun. (completed 1231)
- 1153: Senlis Cathedral begun. (consecrated 1191)
- 1155: Laon Cathedral begun. Reconstructed with three traverses and completed in 1220
- 1150 c. Angers Cathedral rebuilding from Romanesque to Angevin Gothic beginning mid-12th century, completed 1250
- 1162: Poitiers Cathedral begun. (consecrated 1379)
- 1163: Notre Dame de Paris begun. Choir completed in 1172, Cathedral consecrated in 1182.
- 1170: Lyon Cathedral begun. (completed 14th century)
- 1170: Lisieux Cathedral in Normandy reconstruction begins from Romanesque to Gothic style. Work continued until 13th century.

=== High Gothic or Classic Gothic (1180–1230) ===
- 1183: Bourges Cathedral begun, nave was finished by 1255; consecrated in 1324.
- 1194: Chartres Cathedral begun to replace earlier church destroyed by fire. Consecrated 1260. Flamboyant north spire added after earlier spire destroyed by lightning.
- 1210: Coutances Cathedral, Normandy, begun. (completed 1274)
- 1210: Toul Cathedral reconstruction from Romanesque began. Flamboyant facade was added in the 15th century.
- 1211: Reims Cathedral begun. (completed 1345)
- 1217: Le Mans Cathedral begun. (consecrated 1254)
- 1220: Amiens Cathedral begun. (completed 1288). Rose window was added 1366–1341
- 1220 to 1270: Notre-Dame de Paris; Addition of transepts and rose windows, modified buttresses
- 1225: Beauvais Cathedral begun, but after tower falls in 1272 it is left unfinished

=== Rayonnant (1230–1420) ===
- 1231: Basilica of Saint-Denis enlarged with new nave, transept, and rose windows (completed 1264)
- 1238: Sainte-Chapelle on the Ile de la Cité in Paris begun. (completed 1248).
- 1252: Palais des Papes in Avignon begun. (major enlargement and modification between 1334 and 1364)
- 1284: Conciergerie and Palais de la Cité begun on the Ile de la Cité in Paris
- 1340–1410: Château de Vincennes keep and tower

=== Flamboyant Gothic (1400–1520) ===
- 1405–1527: Notre-Dame de l'Épine (begun 1405–1406, completed 1527)
- 1435–1521: Church of Saint-Maclou, Rouen.
- The west facade and towers of Rouen Cathedral rebuilt after a fire in the (16th century)
- 1493–1510: The north façade, south façade, and south porch of the Church of Notre-Dame de Louviers
- 1500–1508: Beauvais Cathedral south transept constructed
- 1507–13: Chartres Cathedral north tower is destroyed by lightning, and rebuilt in the Flamboyant style

== See also ==
- Building a Gothic cathedral
- Early Gothic architecture
- Rayonnant
- Flamboyant
- French Gothic stained glass windows
- High Gothic
- Southern French Gothic
- Gothic cathedrals and churches
- Gothic architecture
- Romanesque architecture
- Architecture of cathedrals and great churches
- Saint-Pierre gate, Nantes

== Bibliography ==
- Darcos, Xavier (1998). Prosper Mérimée (in French). Flammarion. ISBN 2-08-067276-2.
- Ducher, Robert (1988). Caractéristique des Styles (in French). Paris: Flammarion. ISBN 2-08-011539-1.
- Lours, Mathieu (2018). Dictionnaire des Cathédrales (in French). Éditions Jean-Paul Gisserot. ISBN 978-2755-807653.
- Martindale, Andrew, Gothic Art, (1967), Thames and Hudson (in English and French); ISBN 2-87811-058-7
- Mignon, Olivier (2015). Architecture des Cathédrales Gothiques (in French). Éditions Ouest-France. ISBN 978-2-7373-6535-5.
- Mignon, Olivier (2017). Architecture du Patrimoine Française - Abbayes, Églises, Cathédrales et Châteaux (in French). Éditions Ouest-France. ISBN 978-27373-7611-5.
- Renault, Christophe; Lazé, Christophe (2006). Les Styles de l'architecture et du mobilier (in French). Gisserot. ISBN 9-782877-474658.
- Rivière, Rémi; Lavoye, Agnès (2007). La Tour Jean sans Peur, Association des Amis de la tour Jean sans Peur. ISBN 978-2-95164-940-8
- Texier, Simon (2012). Paris Panorama de l'architecture de l'Antiquité à nos jours (in French). Parigramme. ISBN 978-2-84096-667-8.
- Wenzler, Claude (2018). Cathédales Cothiques - un Défi Médiéval (in French). Éditions Ouest-France. ISBN 978-2-7373-7712-9.
- Le Guide du Patrimoine en France (in French). Éditions du Patrimoine, Centre des Monuments Nationaux. 2002. ISBN 978-2-85822-760-0.
