= Gozewijn van Randerath =

Dutch Roman Catholic clergyman (died 1250)

- Bishop of Utrecht
- Church: Catholic Church
- Diocese: Archdiocese of Utrecht
- In office: 1249–1250

Personal details
- Died: 1250

Gozewijn van Randerath was a Dutch Roman Catholic clergyman. He was locally elected to be bishop of Utrecht in 1249, but Pope Innocent IV appointed Henry I van Vianden instead, and so Gozewijn withdrew from the post in 1250.

Due to an error by the medieval historian Johannes de Beka, he was for a long time known as Gozewijn van Amstel, and considered as an uncle or nephew of Gijsbrecht IV of Amstel, the accessory to the murder of Floris V. Under this name, he has a bit-part in Vondel's Gijsbrecht van Aemstel, a play set in 1304.

| Preceded by Otto III van Holland | Bishop of Utrecht; 1249-1250 | Succeeded by Henry I van Vianden |
