= Henry I van Vianden =

Dutch bishop (died 1267)

- Bishop of Utrecht
- Church: Catholic Church
- Diocese: Archdiocese of Utrecht
- In office: 1249–1267

Personal details
- Died: 4 June 1267

Henry (or Hendrik) van Vianden (died 4 June 1267) was a bishop of Utrecht from 1249 to 1267.

He was the son of Henry I, Count of Vianden and Margaret, Marchioness of Namur. He was provost at Cologne before he was pushed forward as candidate for the bishopric of Utrecht by the Welfs in their struggle with the Hohenstaufen. Pope Innocent IV then formally appointed him despite resistance from the canons of Utrecht. Until 1252 he was bishop-elect, but in 1252 he was consecrated. Henry supported the German anti-king William II of Holland, but William exploited the disputes that emerged between Henry, and the nobility and the city of Utrecht. Henry managed to subdue his opponents, but their actions were a precursor to future struggles.

Henry van Vianden granted city rights to a large number of towns, such as Hasselt in 1252, Amersfoort in 1259, Goor in 1263, and Oudewater, Loenen and Vreeland in 1265. In Vreeland he also constructed the Castle Vreeland as a border-fortress against Holland.

In 1254 he laid the first stone of the gothic Dom Church of Utrecht, after the previous church had burned down in a nine-day long city fire in 1253. He was interred in the Dom church.

| Preceded by Gozewijn van Randerath | Bishop of Utrecht; 1249–1267 | Succeeded by John I, Bishop-Elect of Utrecht |
