= Medieval architecture =

Architecture during the Middle Ages

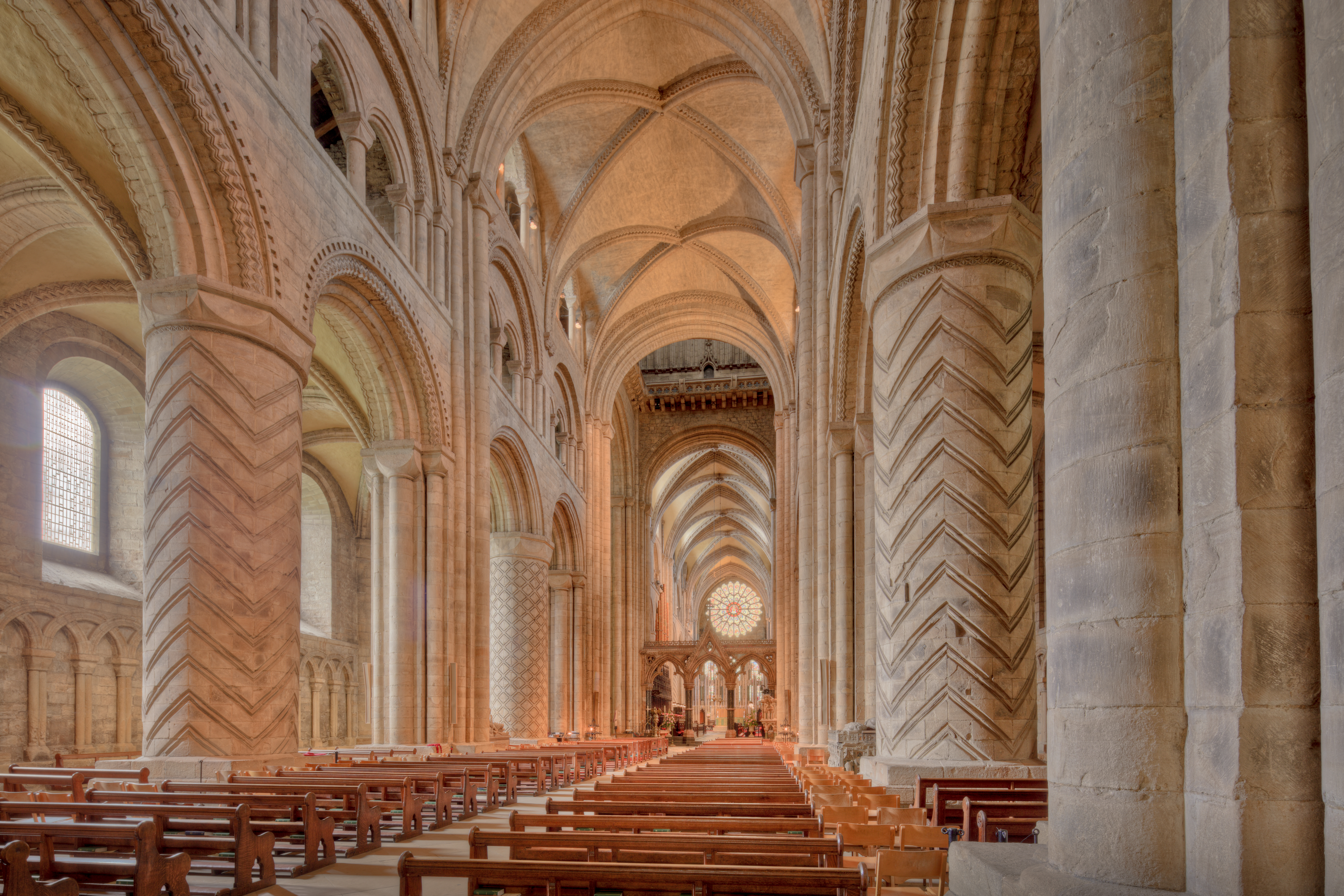
12th-century Romanesque nave of Durham Cathedral with rib vaulting.

Medieval architecture was the art and science of designing and constructing buildings in the Middle Ages. The major styles of the period included pre-Romanesque, Romanesque, and Gothic. In the fifteenth century, architects began to favour classical forms again, in the Renaissance style, marking the end of the medieval period. Many examples of religious, civic, and military architecture from the Middle Ages survive throughout Europe.

== Styles ==
=== Pre-Romanesque ===
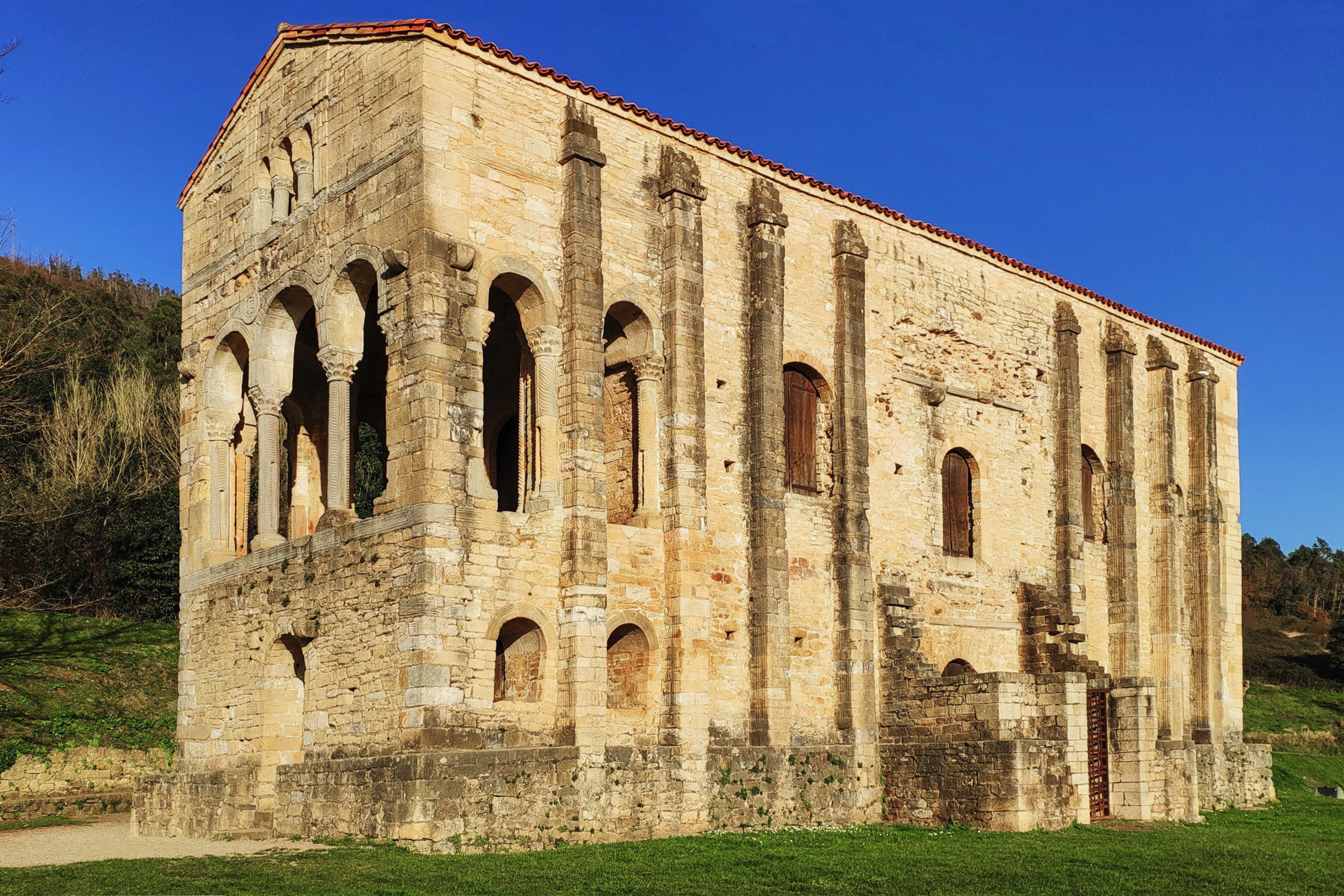
The church of Santa María del Naranco, originally a palace, built in the pre-Romanesque Asturian style in 842 AD

The pre-Romanesque period lasted from the beginning of the Middle Ages (around 500 AD) to the emergence of the Romanesque style (from the 10th century). Much of the notable architecture from the period comes from France and Germany, under the Merovingians and the Carolingians and the Ottonians. Other regions also have examples of architecture from this period, including Croatia, England and Iberia (especially in Asturias and León). In Lombardy, the pre-Romanesque style included many Romanesque features and is therefore known as the First Romanesque.

=== Romanesque ===
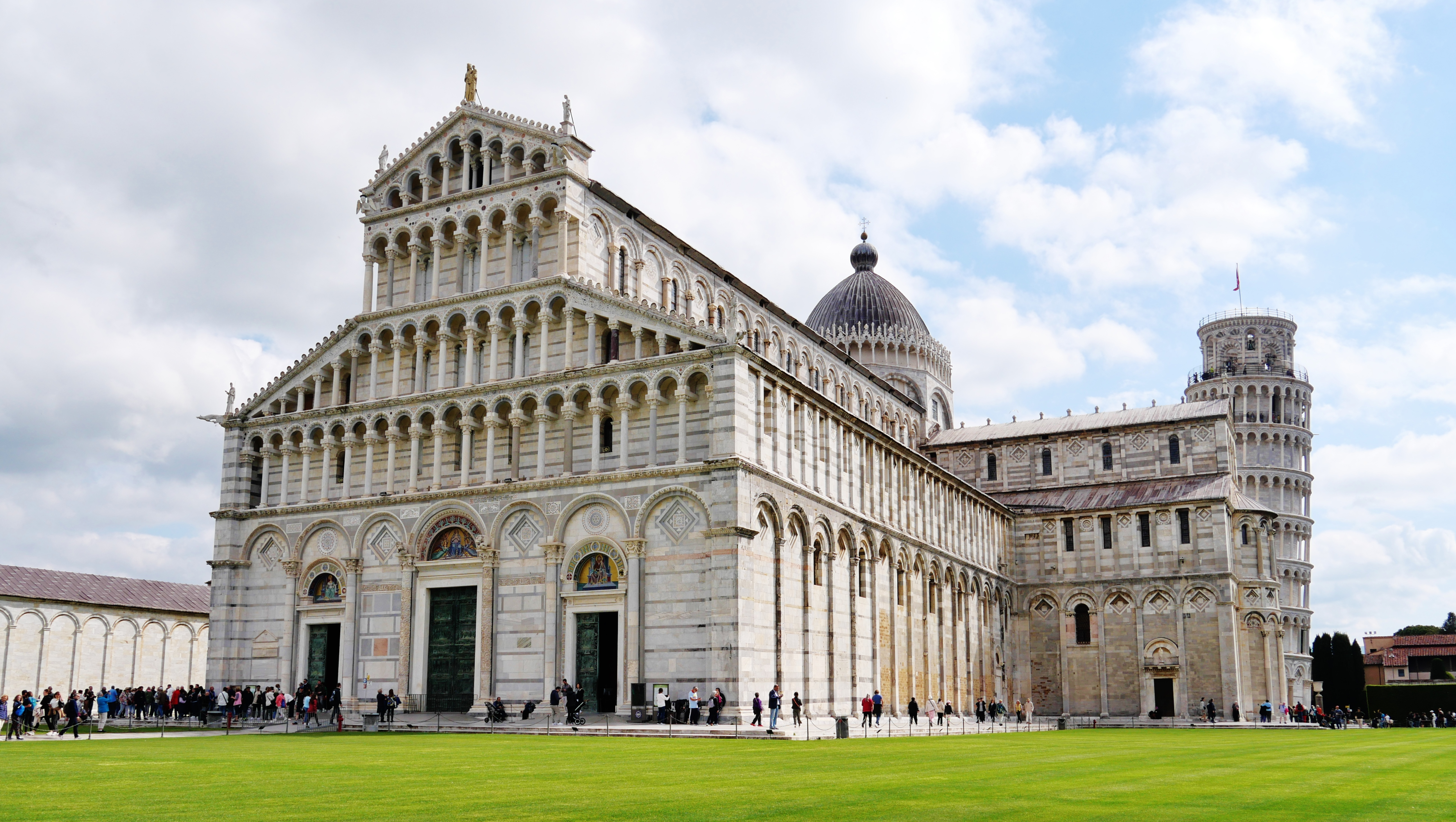
Pisa Cathedral and the Leaning Tower in the Pisan Romanesque style.

The Romanesque style was predominant across Europe during the 11th and 12th centuries. It is characterized by rounded arches, by barrel or groin vaulting and by thick walls. The first and greatest patrons of Romanesque architecture came from the Church, especially monastic traditions such as Cluniacs and the Cistercians, but examples of Romanesque civic and military buildings survive.

The term 'Romanesque' (literally meaning 'in the manner of the Romans') was first used to describe the style in 1819. Although the style did draw on ancient Roman architecture, it was ultimately an original style and had a wider range of influences than the name suggests.

Examples of Romanesque architecture survive across Europe, including in England, France, Germany, Italy, Spain, Scandinavia and Eastern Europe.

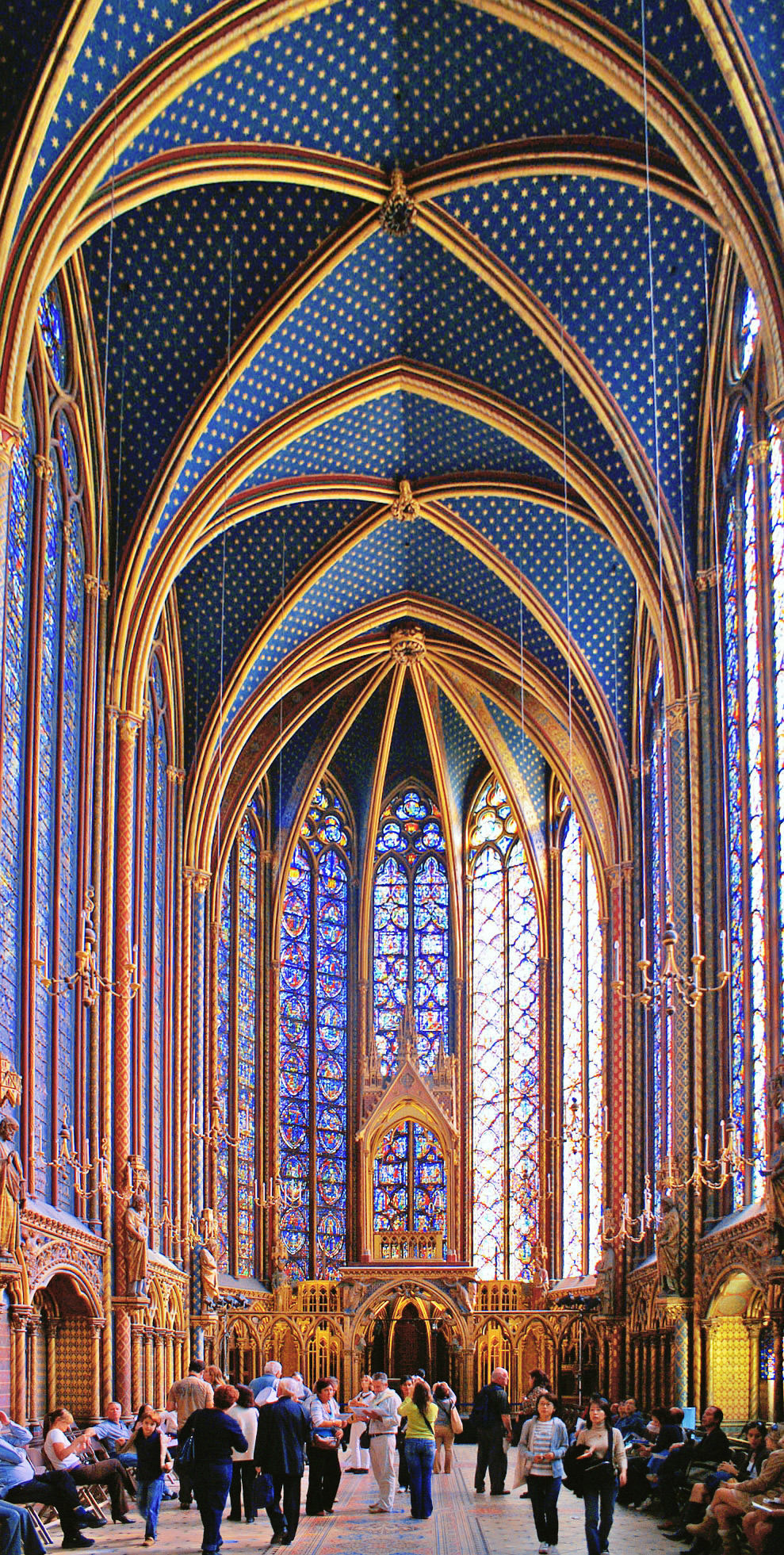
Sainte-Chapelle, Paris, built in the Rayonnant Gothic style between 1238 and 1248.

=== Gothic ===
The Gothic style was predominant across Europe between the late 12th century and the end of the Middle Ages in the 15th century. The key feature of Gothic architecture is pointed arches. Other features, including rib vaulting, exterior buttresses, elaborate tracery and stained glass, are commonly found in Gothic architecture. The choir of the Basilica of Saint-Denis in France, completed in 1144, is considered to be the first wholly Gothic building, combining all of these elements.

The term 'Gothic' (literally meaning 'in the manner of the Goths') was first used in the 16th century by Giorgio Vasari. However, the Goths, an ancient Germanic people, had no influence on the Gothic style. The Gothic style actually evolved from Romanesque architecture in France. A number of other factors and styles may have influenced early Gothic architecture. Architecture that combines elements of both the Romanesque and Gothic styles is sometimes referred to as Romano-Gothic.

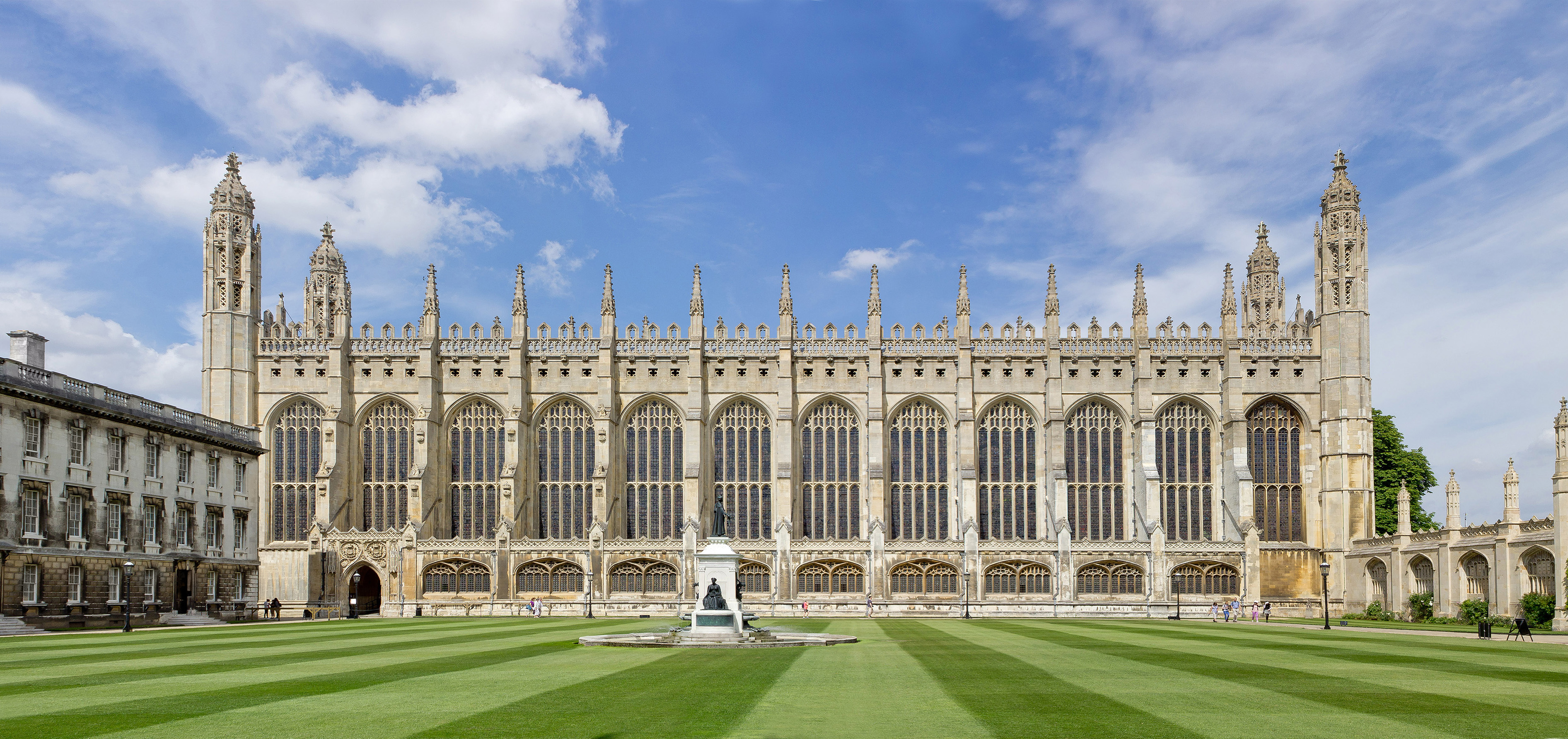
King's College Chapel, Cambridge, built in the Perpendicular Gothic style between 1446 and 1515.

Scholars have divided Gothic architecture into a number of different periods: Early Gothic in the 12th century, High Gothic (similar to Classic Gothic) in the 13th century, and Late Gothic from the 14th century. During the High Gothic period, Rayonnant was the primary style in France and Decorated was the main style in England. In the Late Gothic period, Flamboyant was the primary style in France (and Spain) and Perpendicular was the main style in England. Although from the 15th century the Gothic style was replaced by Renaissance architecture, marking the end of the Middle Ages and medieval architecture, there were Gothic Revival and Romanesque Revival movements in the nineteenth century.

Both religious and secular examples of medieval Gothic architecture survive, notably a number of cathedrals. Examples survive across Europe, including in Belarus, Czechia, England, France, Italy, Lithuania, the Low Countries, Poland, Portugal, Scandinavia, and Spain. Each country developed a unique style of Gothic architecture, as did many smaller regions, including Southern France, Milan, Venice, Catalonia, Levante, and Valencia. The Brick Gothic style was widespread around the Baltic and in North Germany. Towards the end of the Gothic period, a number of new regional styles emerged, often incorporating elements of Renaissance architecture. These include the Plateresque in Spain, Isabelline in Castile, Manueline in Portugal, and Sondergotik around Germany.

== Functions ==
=== Religious architecture ===
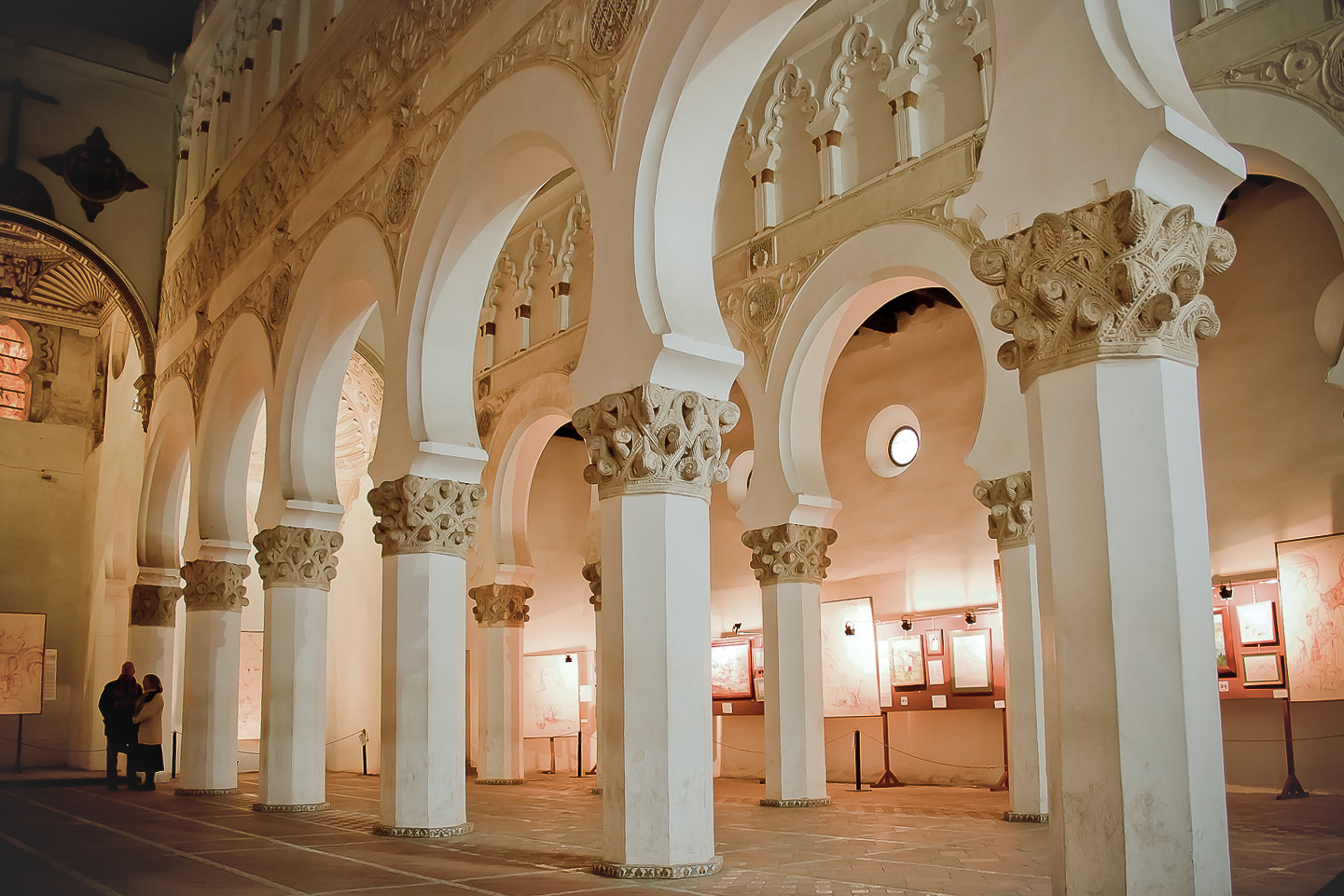
The synagogue of Santa María la Blanca, Toledo, built c. 1200 and later converted into a Catholic church.

Many surviving medieval buildings originally served a religious purpose. The architecture of the buildings depended on the religion it served, the region it was located in, and the styles during the time. For example, mosques often had domes, whereas churches usually had bell towers. Although some examples of medieval synagogues and mosques survive, particularly in Spain, Christian churches and monasteries are the most common survival throughout Europe.

A number of different types of medieval church survive: parish churches, such as in York; cathedral churches; such as across England; and abbey churches, such as across England. Most surviving churches are in the Gothic style, and share a number of features — stained glass, vaulting, buttresses, and an altar at the east end. Churches usually took the shape of a cross, with a nave, chancel, transepts and aisles. Churches often had reliquaries to display precious relics. Their design often had religious symbolism, such as Sunday Christ paintings and biblical narratives in stained glass. The surviving churches are almost entirely made out of stone.

=== Military architecture ===
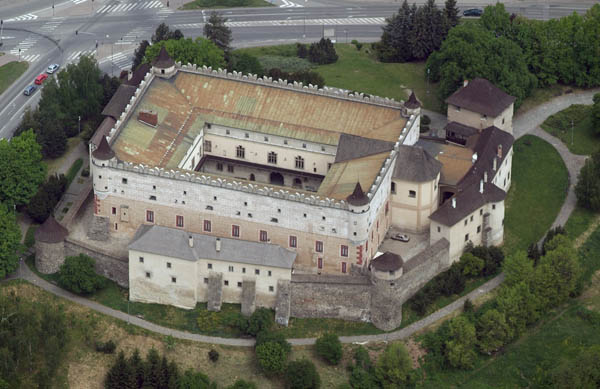
Zvolen Castle in Slovakia strongly inspired by Italian castles of the fourteenth century

A diagram of a Motte and Bailey Castle

Surviving examples of medieval secular architecture mainly served for defense, these include forts, castles, tower houses, and fortified walls. Fortifications were built during the Middle Ages to display the power of the lords of the land and reassure common folk in their protection of property and livelihood. In the early Middle Ages, fortifications were made from wood and earth, these were called Motte and bailey castles. These consist of a stockade or palisade surrounding an enclosed courtyard and man-made mound. This fortification acted as a passive obstacle that potential enemies would have to face to attack the civilization. However, this method of fortification had its downside including being vulnerable to fires so more methods of fortification were created.

Military architecture began to start being created with stone in the 11th century, it was also used to indicate wealth and power of the area protected with it. Stone was much more durable and was fireproof. They also began to adopt the use of cylindrical ground plans. There were many benefits to a cylindrical shape, it reduced blindspots, they were more resistant. Some examples of cylindrical fortifications are the gate towers at Harlech Castle and the Tour des Pénitents.

Medieval Fortifications also displayed many different defensive elements including, hoardings, loopholes or crosslets, and moats. Hoarding and loopholes were both beneficial for the archers or missile throwers, allowing them to see their targets better. Windows gained a cross-shape for more than decorative purposes, they provided a perfect fit for a crossbowman to shoot invaders from inside safely. Moats were used as a defensive mechanism for keeping attackers further away from the fort, while most were kept dry, moats were much more effective when wet.

=== Civic architecture ===
While much of the surviving medieval architecture is either religious or military, examples of civic and even domestic architecture can be found throughout Europe. Examples include manor houses, town halls, almshouses and bridges, but also residential houses. Walled towns were constructed across Europe, including in Austria. The Civic landscape of Europe was built up of the crown, the church, guilds, mayors, and the elite. It was also largely running off of ceremonies that connected these relationships. The examples of the civic architecture mentioned in the last paragraph were mostly owned by the elite or government buildings. For example, manor houses were owned by bishops and located closely in relation to churches. These buildings, due to their higher class ownership, were more large in scale with elements that displayed wealth. They also provide an insight into the social history of the area it sits in through its architecture due to them adapting throughout the years to accommodate what the owner needed most. Majority of these buildings were made of stone while some were also wood framed.

== See also ==
- Ad Quadratum: The Practical Application of Geometry in Medieval Architecture
- Architecture of Kievan Rus'
- Architecture of the Tarnovo Artistic School
- Byzantine architecture
- Medieval Scandinavian architecture
- Medieval Serbian architecture
- List of medieval stone bridges in Germany
- List of medieval bridges in France
