= Ad Quadratum: The Practical Application of Geometry in Medieval Architecture =

2002 book

- Editor: Nancy Y. Wu
- Language: English
- Genre: Non-fiction
- Publisher: Ashgate Publishing
- Publication date: 2002

Ad Quadratum: The Practical Application of Geometry in Medieval Architecture is an edited volume on the mathematical design of medieval architecture. It was edited by Nancy Y. Wu, published in 2002 by Ashgate Publishing, and reprinted in 2016 by Routledge.

== Title ==
The title, ad quadratum, refers to a phrase used by medieval architects to describe building designs based on the geometry of the square, including the use of ratios based on polygonal geometry such as the square root of two ratio between the sides and diagonal of the square. The phrase has also been used previously for other publications on the geometric study of medieval architecture, notably in a 1921 book by Frederik Macody Lund, Ad Quadratum: A Study of the Geometrical Bases of Classic and Medieval Religious Architecture.

== Topics ==
After a preface by Wu and W. W. Clark, and an introduction by Eric Fernie, Ad Quadratum includes eleven chapters:

- "Geometry on a Carolingian wall", by Warren Sanderson, studies the triangular composition of paintings on a wall in Trier, Germany.
- "A proposal for constructing the plan and elevation of a Romanesque church using three measures", by Marie-Therèse Zenner, studies the Church of Saint-Étienne of Nevers using a "very complex and farraginous hypothetical geometrical layout".
- "Measure and proportion in Romanesque architecture", by James Addis, studies the same church as Zenner, instead finding a modular system of measurements based on the Roman foot.
- "A schematic plan for Norwich Cathedral", by Nigel Hiscock, proposes a complex design principle for Norwich Cathedral combining triangular, square, and pentagonal forms, criticized by Christian Freigang as "hardly plausible" for such a repetitive and consistently designed building.
- "The plan of Saint-Quentin: Pentagon and square in the genesis of high Gothic design", by Ellen M. Shortell, shows the appearance of pentagonal forms beginning around the 13th century, in the Basilica of Saint-Quentin.
- "The hand of the mind: The ground plan of Reims as a case study", by Nancy Y. Wu, again shows the emergence of pentagonal geometry in 13th-century Gothic architecture, in Reims Cathedral, and "reveals the theological implications of the spatial geometry of its east end".
- "Reconciling the feet at Beauvais and Amiens Cathedrals", by Stephen Murray, compares the designs of Amiens Cathedral and Beauvais Cathedral, both of a similar height. Murray suggests that a unified measurement system at Amiens, and a lack of coordination between two measurement systems at Beauvais, contributed to the success of the Amiens building and to structural problems at Beauvais.
- "On the drawing board: Plans of the Clermont Cathedral terrace", by Michael T. Davis, investigates construction drawings engraved into Clermont-Ferrand Cathedral, and the design processes that these drawings provide a window into.
- "Geometry studies: The blind tracery in the western chapels of Narbonne Cathedral", by Vivian Paul, also provides a detailed investigation into the design process at Narbonne Cathedral, based on the grid that was used to transfer its tracery.
- "The Church of St. George of the Latins in Famagusta: A case study on medieval metrology and design techniques", by Alpay Özdural, studies the Nestorian Church in Famagusta, on Cyprus, as a study in the export and persistence of many different measurement systems from Europe to Cyprus over the centuries, eventually concluding that Roman measures likely formed the design basis for this building. It also analyzes the use of Pythagorean harmonies in the ratios of its measurements.
- "Geometry and scenography in the late Gothic choir of Metz Cathedral", by Robert Bork, analyses the alignment of windows in Metz Cathedral from the point of view of scenography.

== Overall evaluation ==
The geometric and arithmetic analysis of architecture was a popular subject of 19th-century scholarship, but diminished to a backwater of medieval studies; this book represents something of a revival of the topic, following earlier work in the mid-20th century by Otto von Simson. Reviewer Maria Teresa Bartoli writes that this is a problematic area, in part because of ambiguities and contradictions in the way systems of measurements are defined by its investigators. Nevertheless, the subject has been put on a firmer foundation by its investigators' insistence on exact measurements in small units, and a mixture of arithmetic and geometric design principles. The book represents the state of the art for its time in the geometric analysis of medieval architecture.

One criticism of reviewer Christian Freigang is that all of the works in this volume assume that mathematical considerations were paramount in the design of these buildings; they do not take into account the use needs of the buildings, or engineering issues such as the designer's experience with different types of stone. Freigang also points to a failure to acknowledge French and German language studies of the same topics, and criticizes as "an outmoded questioning" the consideration of music theory and arithmetic harmony in these design studies. In contrast, Christiane Joost-Gaugier writes that the works in this book clearly show the reverence of medieval architects for the works of Pythagoras and Euclid, and demonstrate "that number, measure, and proportion were used to elucidate ineffable truths in Gothic building programs" and enable them "to form perfect harmonies".

Although the book is heavily illustrated, Bartoli also criticizes it as being difficult to understand in parts because the authors attempt to describe their analyses only in prose, without graphic demonstrations; she calls for an improved description system for the geometric analysis of architecture. Joost-Gaugier takes issue with the technicality of its introduction, and with the "excessive modesty of its index".
