= Classic Gothic =

Architectural style specific to France

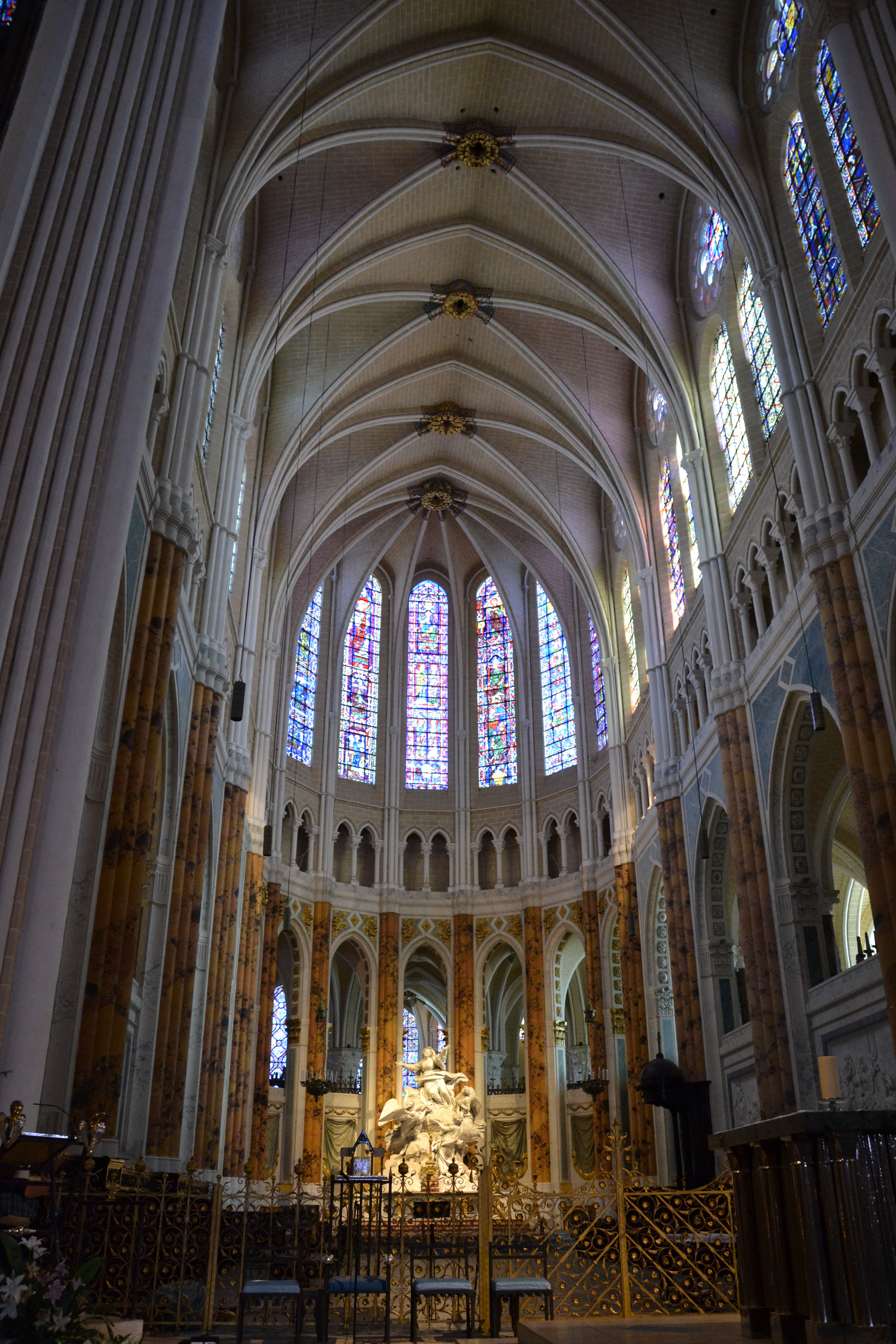
Apse of Notre-Dame de Chartres in the Eure-et-Loir department of France, the onset of Classic Gothic in French context, but still Early Gothic in wider European context

Classic Gothic (French: Gothique classique) is a French term for the second phase of Gothic architecture in France, as defined by French scholars. The common English term for the period is High Gothic. This is disputed by German scholars. The German definition of High Gothic requires bar tracery, which did not arrive in French cathedrals until the construction of Reims Cathedral, but the English definition does not.

The French definition of "Gothique Classique" calls for a long nave covered with quadripartite rib vaults and flanked by collateral aisles, a large transept, a choir, and a semi-circular deambulatory leading to a ring of small chapels. This model appeared at Chartres Cathedral and was copied at Reims Cathedral and other later structures.

Another characteristic separating "Gothique Classique" from Early Gothic is the absence of lateral tribunes between the upper lower levels of the walls. These tribunes originally provided stability to the walls, but with the development of higher and stronger flying buttresses they were no longer needed.

Church buildings of Classic Gothic have triforia, or interior galleries on the upper level of the wall, above the side aisles, looking into the nave. These galleries had no exterior windows. Triforia with windows are typical for Rayonnant Gothic, which was initiated in 1231 by the reconstruction of the upper parts of the choir of the Basilica of Saint-Denis.

Whereas in Primary Gothic the walls of all apses and chapels have round footplans, in Classic Gothic most have polygonal footplans, at least above the level of the window sills. The first polygonal choir in a major church was contemporary with French Gothic, but outside France and not in Gothic style; it is the western choir of Worms Cathedral.

== Features ==
=== Bar tracery ===
One important innovation was introduced in this period; the use of bar tracery to separate the pieces of glass in the windows. The earliest Gothique Classique cathedrals, including Chartres Cathedral, used plate tracery, by which the opening for the glass was cut into a stone slab or plate. This required relatively small panes of glass which admitted less light. The innovations of the 12th century, particularly the new vaults and the use flying buttresses, made possible thinner lateral walls and larger windows. Instead of being set into thick stone frames, the window panes could be separated by thin stone mouldings or bars. These new windows were much lighter and larger and allowed more openings and more intricate designs.

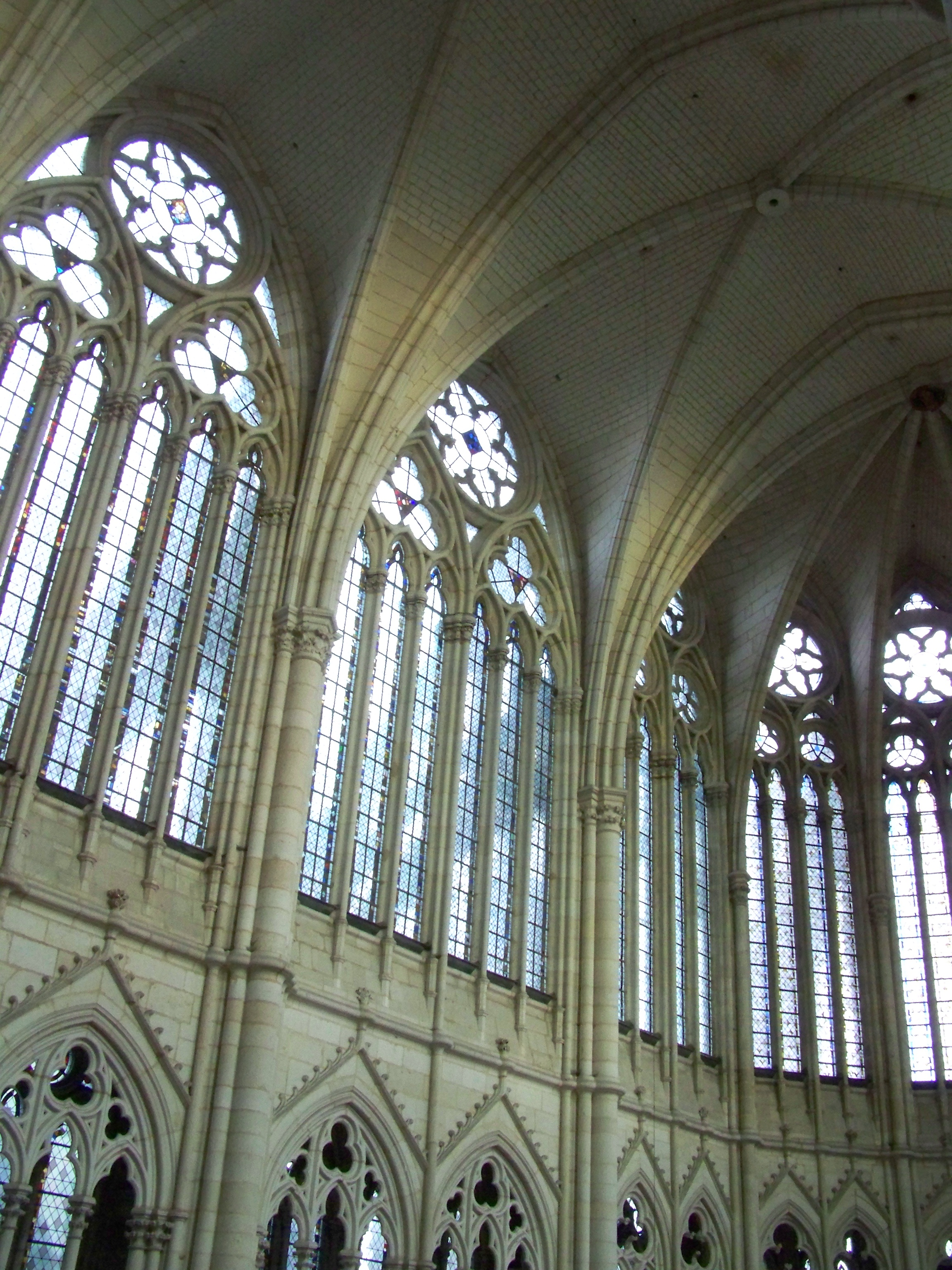
Bar tracery windows at Amiens Cathedral

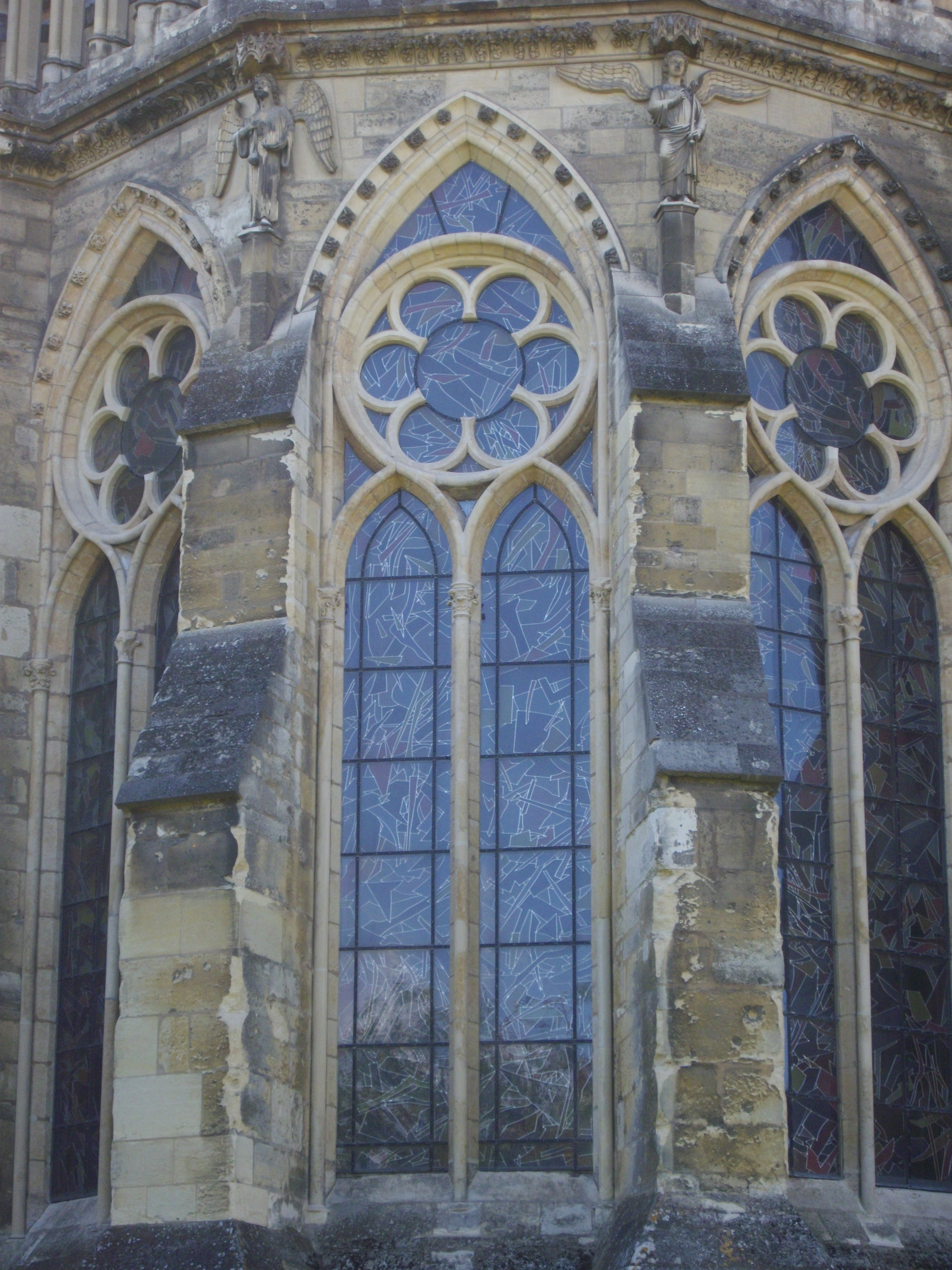
Bar tracery windows at Reims Cathedral

== Simplified interior elevations ==
In Classic cathedrals the nave walls were usually divided into three levels, with the arcade on the ground floor, the triforium or passageway above it, and the clerestory with large windows at the top. They had higher and thinner walls than Early Gothic churches, made possible largely by the support outside the walls provided by the flying buttresses.

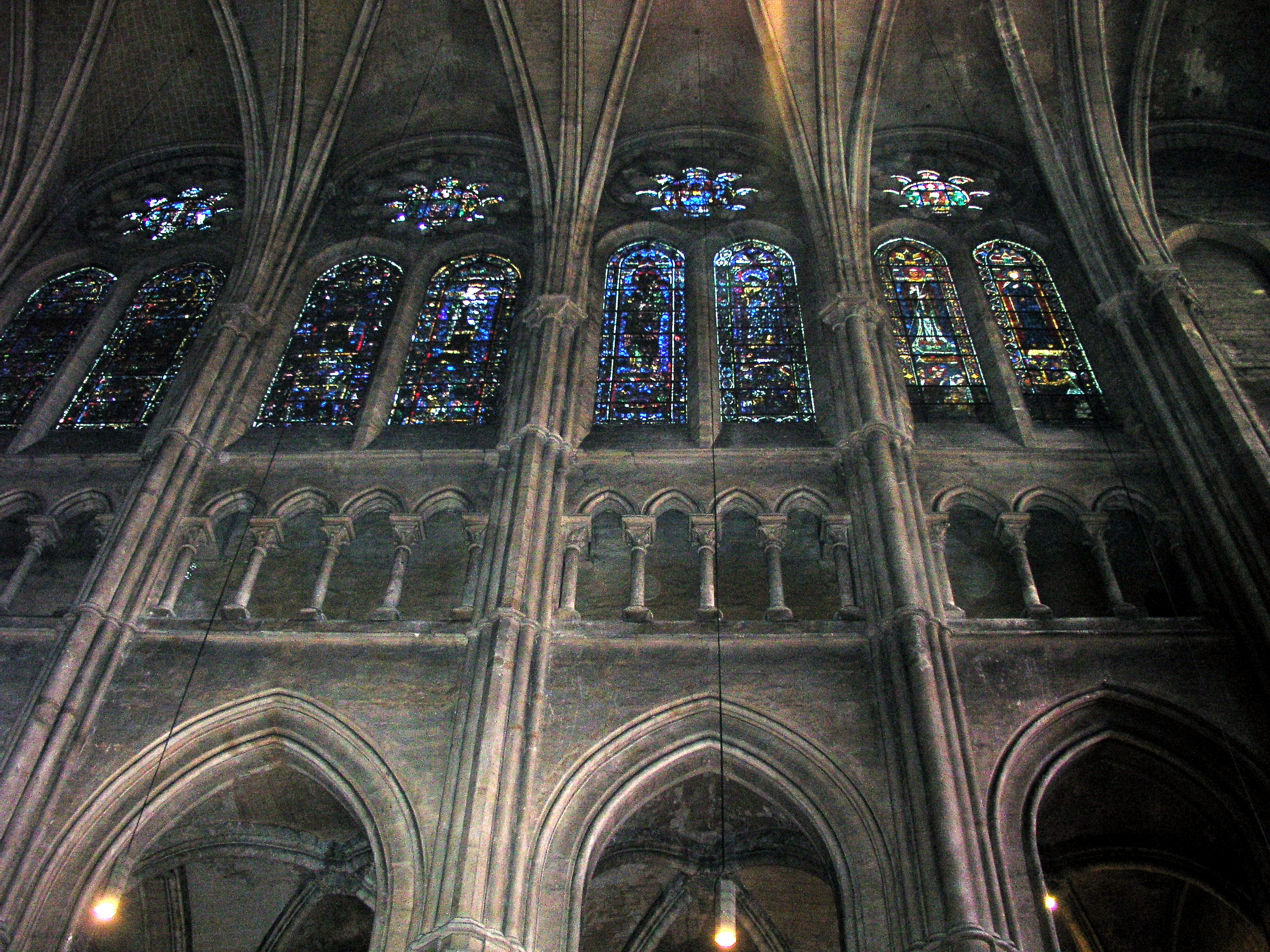
The three levels of the Chartres Cathedral interior

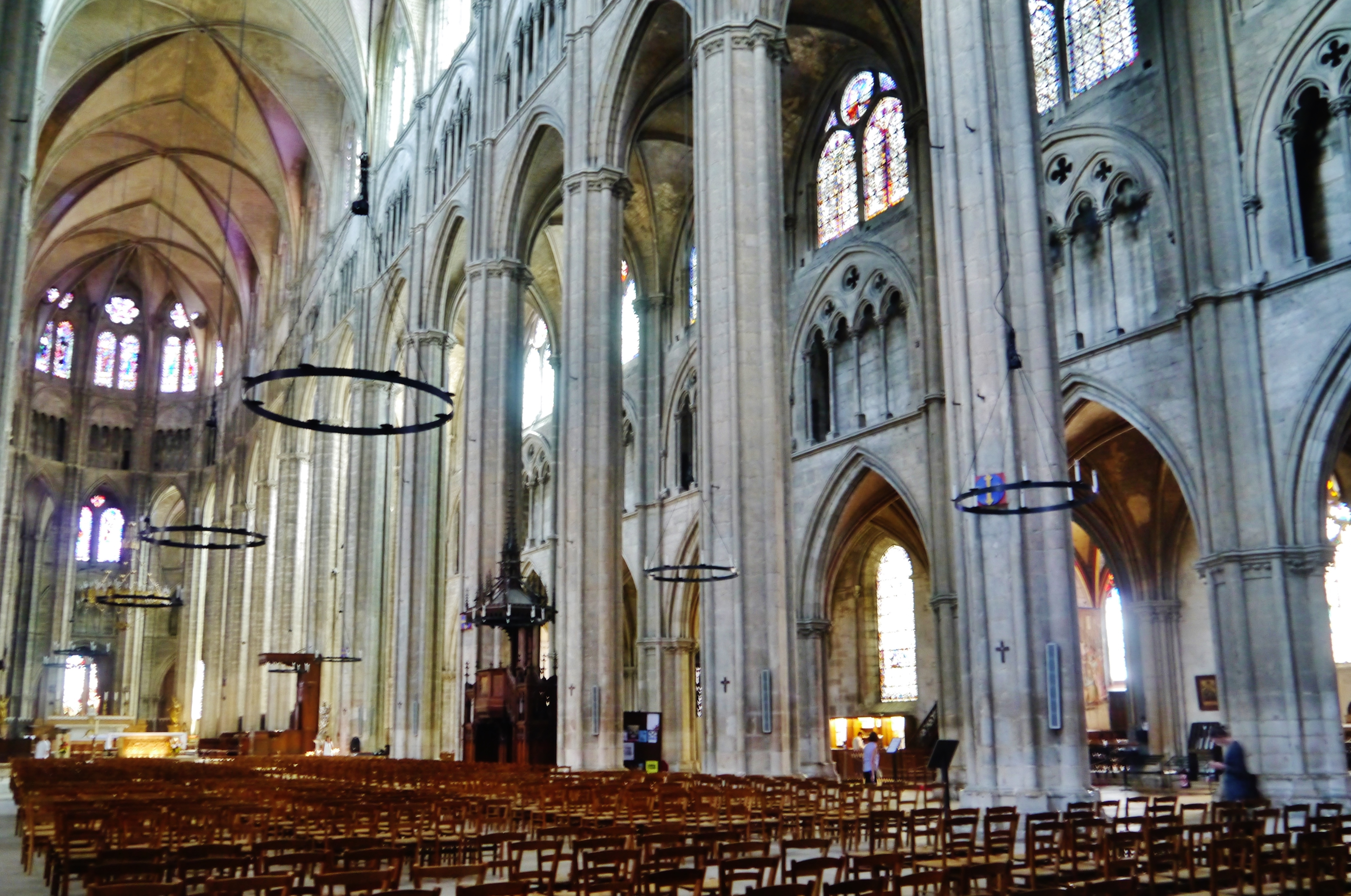
The three levels of the interior of Bourges Cathedral

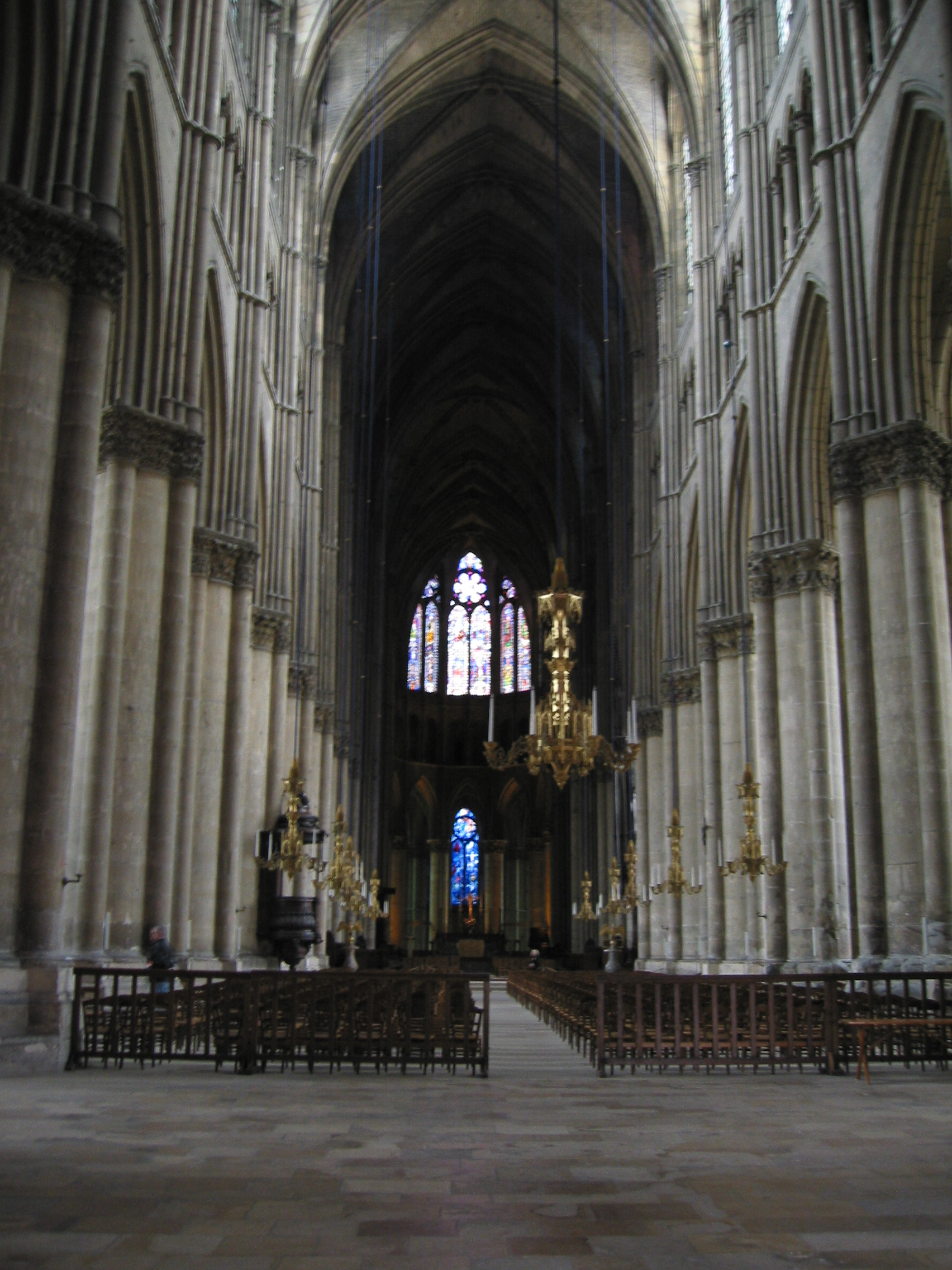
Interior of Reims Cathedral

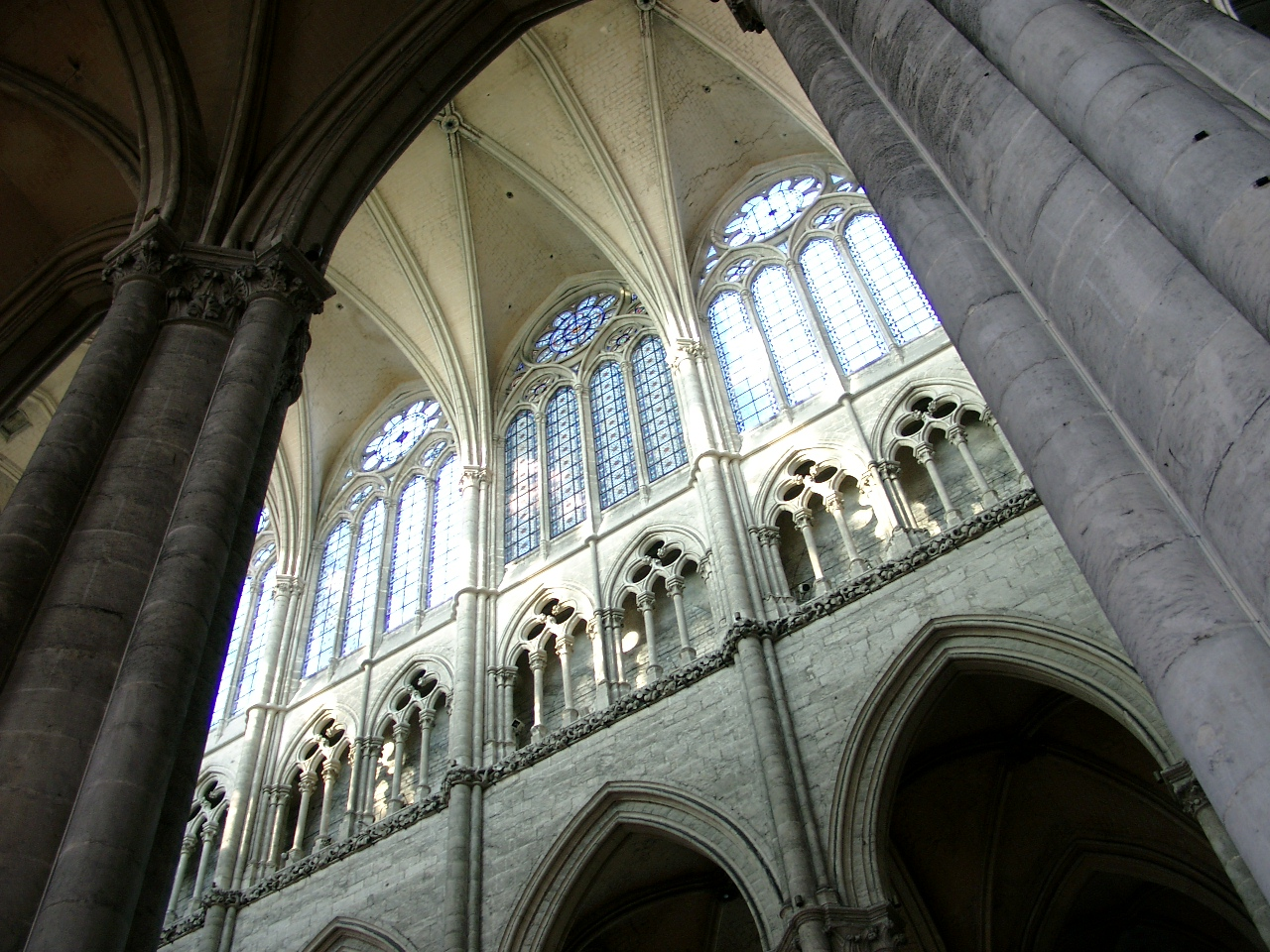
The three levels and vaults of Amiens Cathedral

== Examples ==
=== Chartres Cathedral (1194–1225) ===
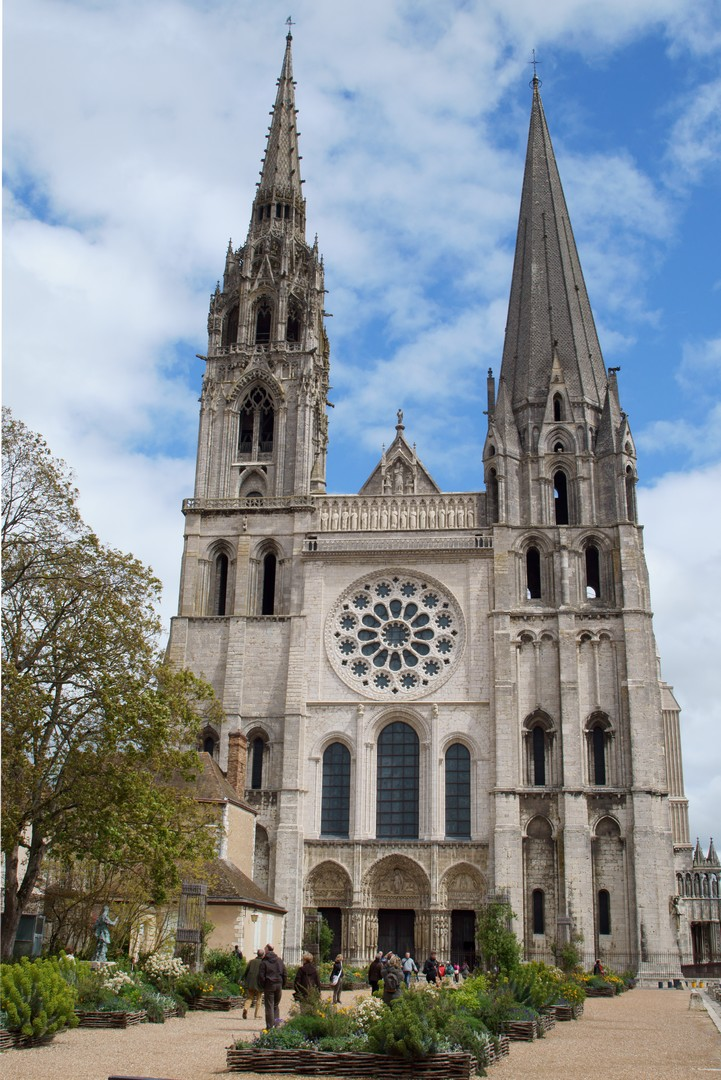
Chartres Cathedral

The rebuilt Chartres Cathedral (1194) is considered the first example of a Gothic cathedral. building of Classic Gothic. A series of earlier cathedrals in Chartres beginning in the fourth century, were destroyed by fire. The cathedral immediately previous to the present church burned in 1194, leaving only the crypt, towers, and the recently built west front. Rebuilding began the same year, with support from the Pope, the King, and the wealthy nobility and merchants of the city. Work was nearly completed by 1225, with the architecture, glass and sculpture finished, though the seven steeples were still being rebuilt. It was not formally reconsecrated until 1260. Only a few changes were made since that time, including the addition of a new chapel dedicated to Saint Piat in 1326, and the covering of the choir columns with stucco and the addition marble reliefs in behind the stalls in the 1750s.

The new cathedral was 130.2 meters long and 30 meters high in the nave longer and higher than Notre-Dame de Paris. Since the cathedral was constructed with the new flying buttresses, the walls were more stable, enabling the builders to eliminate the tribune level, and have more space for windows. Nevertheless, its windows have either no tracery (apse and chapels) or plate tracery (celestories), therefore, by international phasing, the whole cathedral (besides later additions) is still an example of Early Gothic.

The famous Royal Portal of the west façade had been built before the fire, in 1134–1150, and therefore is still Primary Gothic. The fronts of the north and south transepts are High Gothic, as is the sculpture of the six thirteenth-century portals. The spire on the north tower is later Flamboyant. Chartres still has much of its original medieval stained glass, famous for the deep color called Chartres blue.

Chartres Cathedral

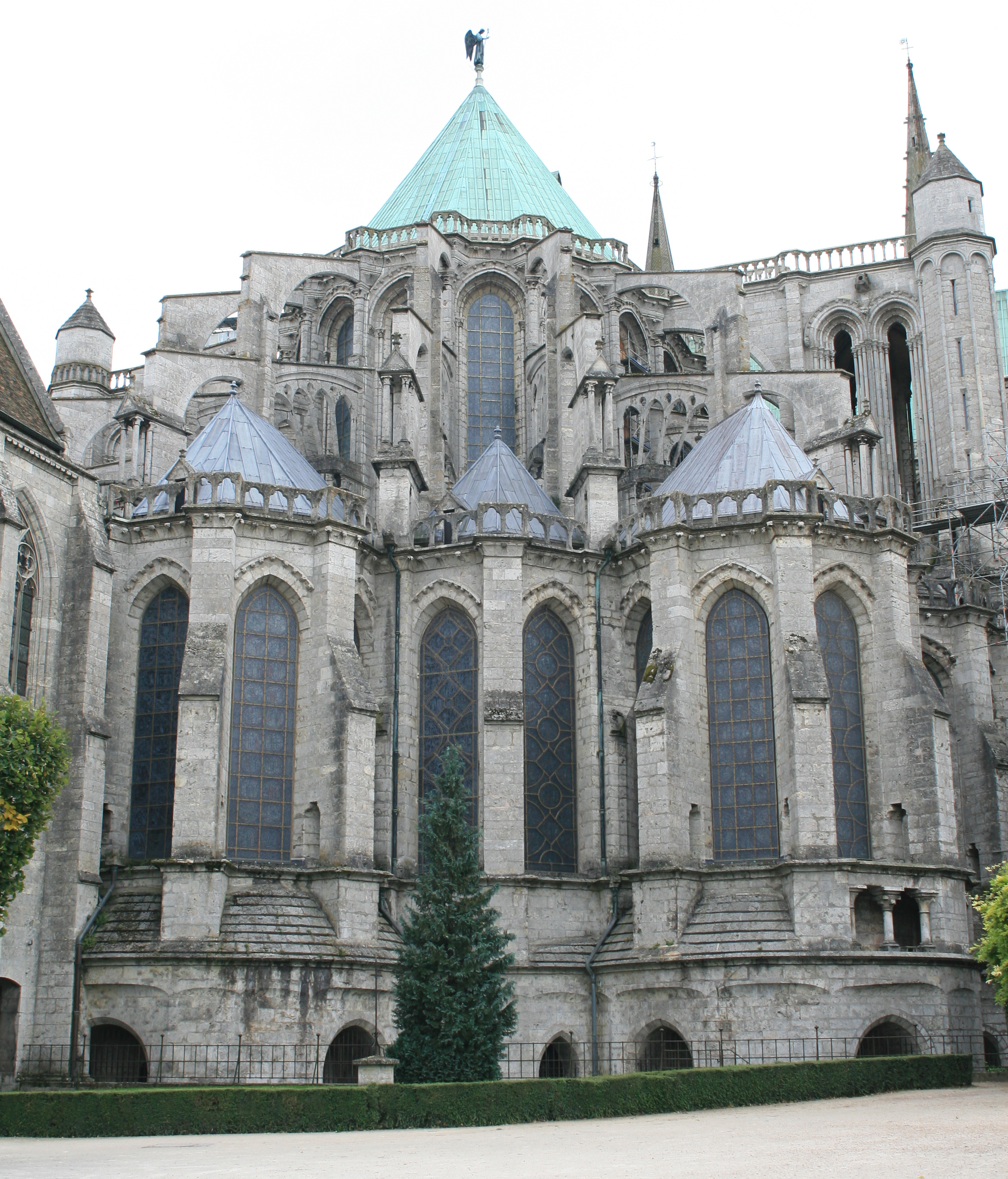
The choir and the apse chapels of Chartres Cathedral, except of the crypts already polygonal

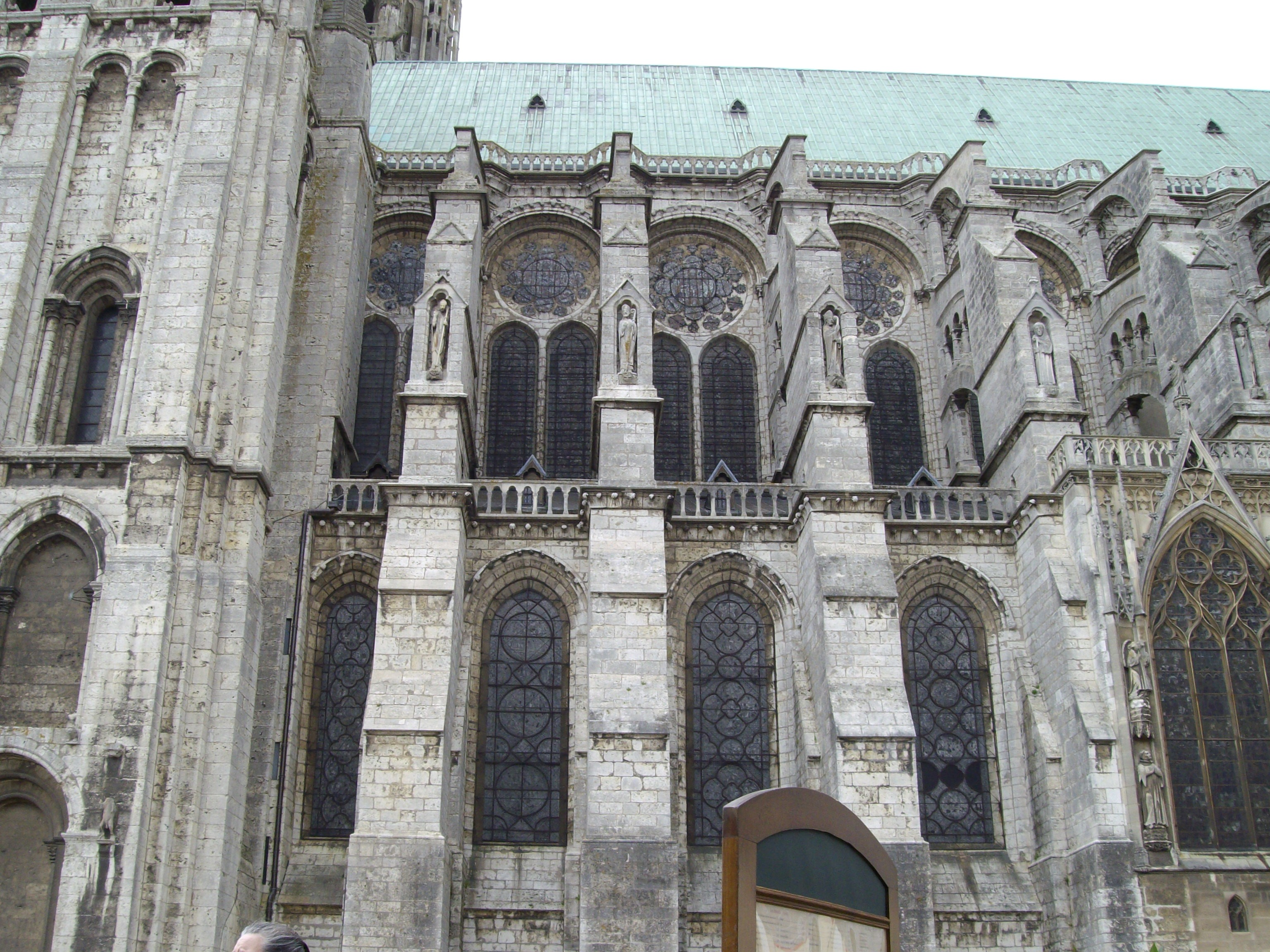
South side of the nave: No fine tracery, except of the Flamboyant window on the very right

=== Bourges Cathedral (1195–1230) ===
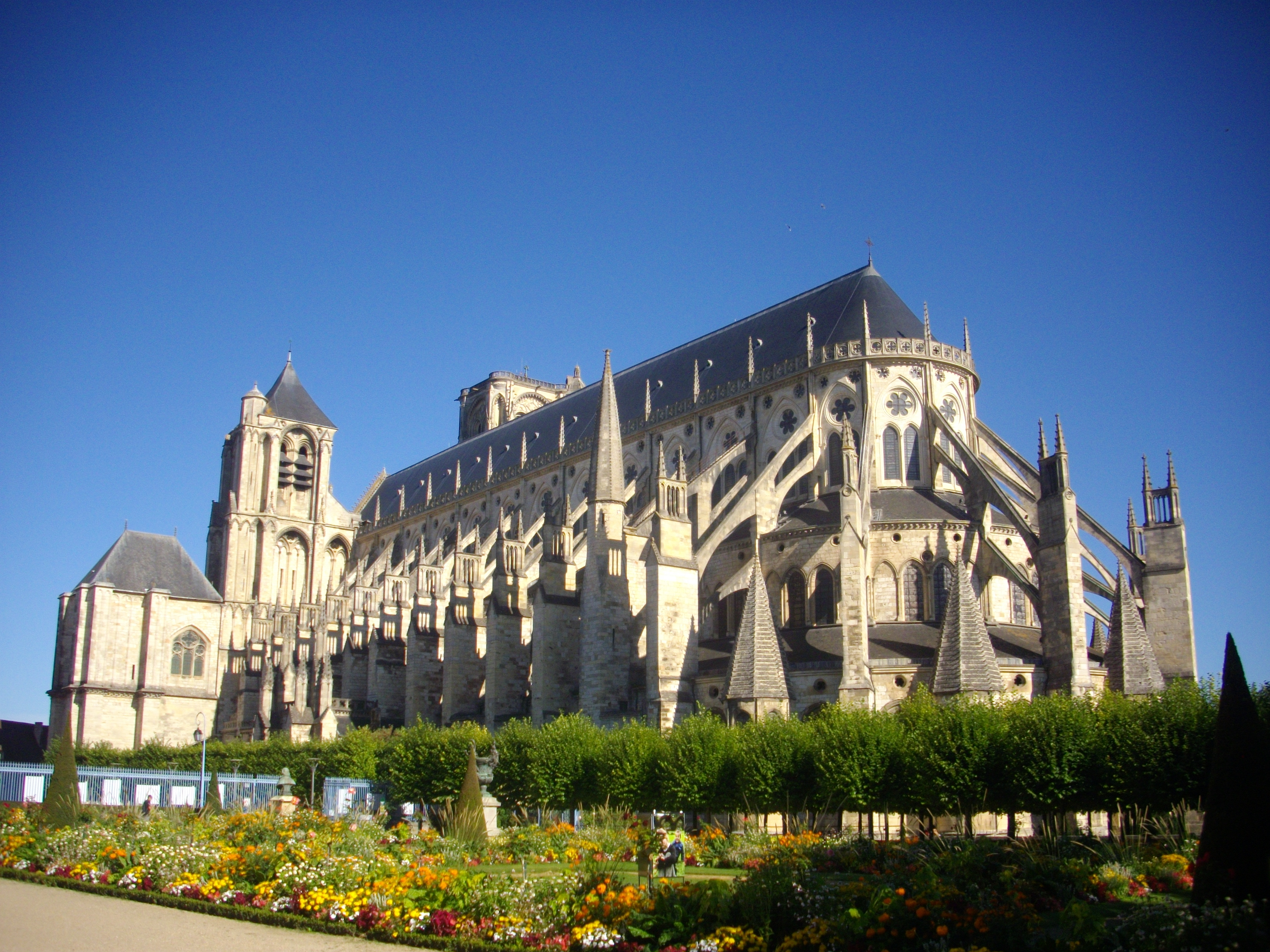
Bourges Cathedral

While most High Gothic cathedrals generally followed the Chartres plan, Bourges Cathedral took a different direction. It was built by Bishop Henri de Sully, whose brother, Eudes de Sully, was the bishop of Paris, and its construction in several ways followed Notre-Dame de Paris and not Chartres. Like Chartres, the builders simplified the vertical plan to three levels; grand arcades, triforium, and high windows. The triforium was simplified a long horizontal band, the entire length of the church. However, unlike Paris, Bourges continued to use the older six-part rib vault used in Paris. This meant that the weight of the vaults fell unevenly upon the nave, and required, like Early Gothic cathedrals, alternating strong and weak pillars. This was artfully hidden by the use of large cylindrical piers, each surrounded by eight engaged colonettes. The piers of the arcade are particularly imposing; each is 21 m (69 ft) tall.

Since Bourges used six-part rib vaults instead of the lighter four-part vaults, the upper walls had to resist greater outward thrust, and the flying buttresses had to be more effective. The Bourges buttresses used a unique design with a particularly acute angle, which gave it the necessary force, but it was also reinforced by thicker and stronger walls than Chartres.

The predominant sensation at Bourges is not only great height, but great length and interior space; the cathedral is 120 m (390 ft) long, without a transept or other interruption. The most unusual feature of Bourges Cathedral is the arrangement of vertical height; each part of the elevation is set back, like steps, with the highest roof and vaults over the central aisle. The outermost aisles have vaults nine meters high; the intermediate aisles have vaults 21.3 m (70 ft) high; and the center aisle has vaults 37.5 m (123 ft) high.

Many later Gothic cathedrals followed the Chartres model, but several were influenced by Bourges, including Le Mans Cathedral, the modified Beauvais Cathedral, and Toledo Cathedral in Spain, which copied the system of vaults of different heights.

Bourges Cathedral

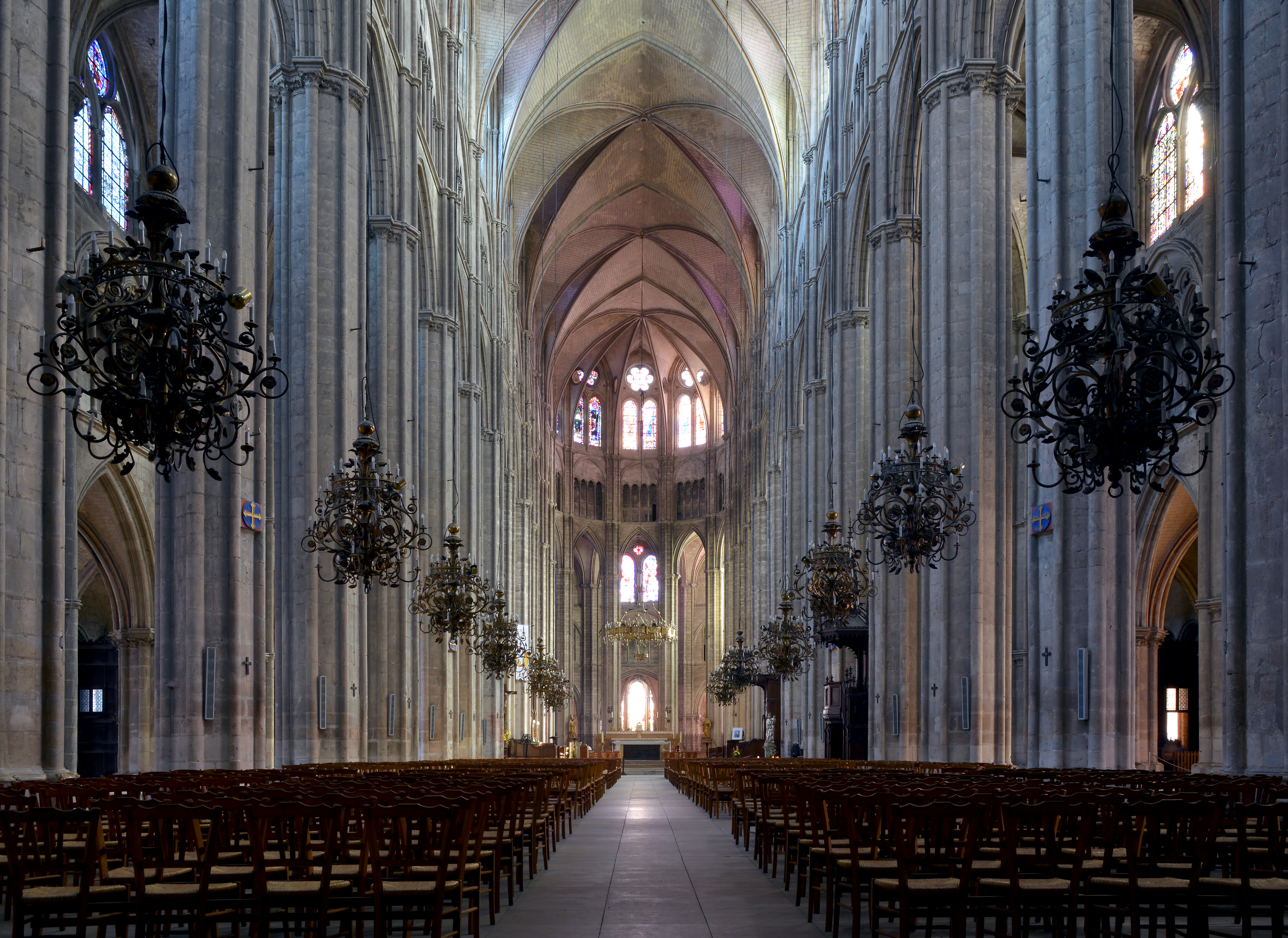
Nave, with 21-meter-high piers of the grand arcades

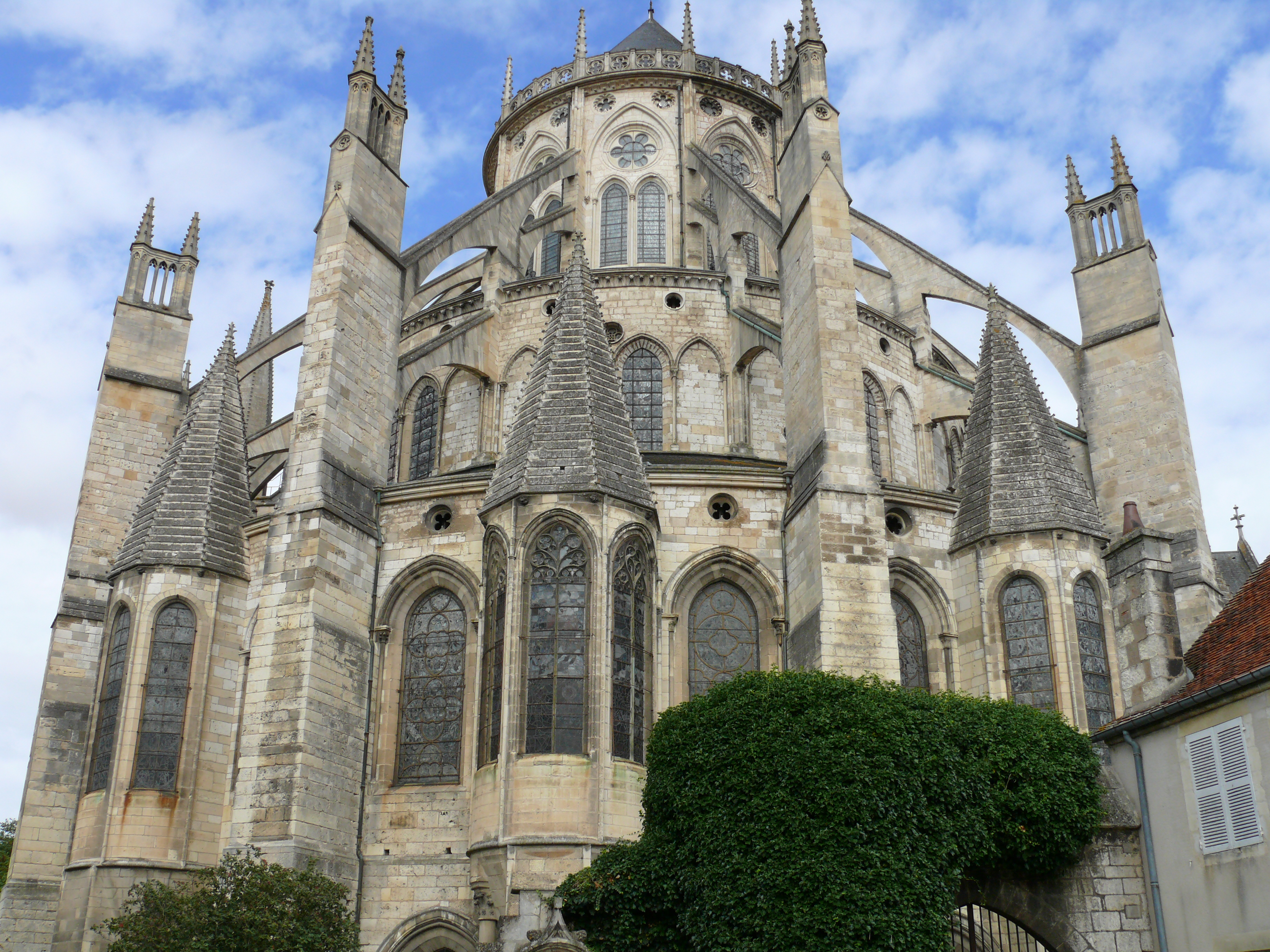
The chevet, all windows without tracery

=== Reims Cathedral (begun in 1211) ===
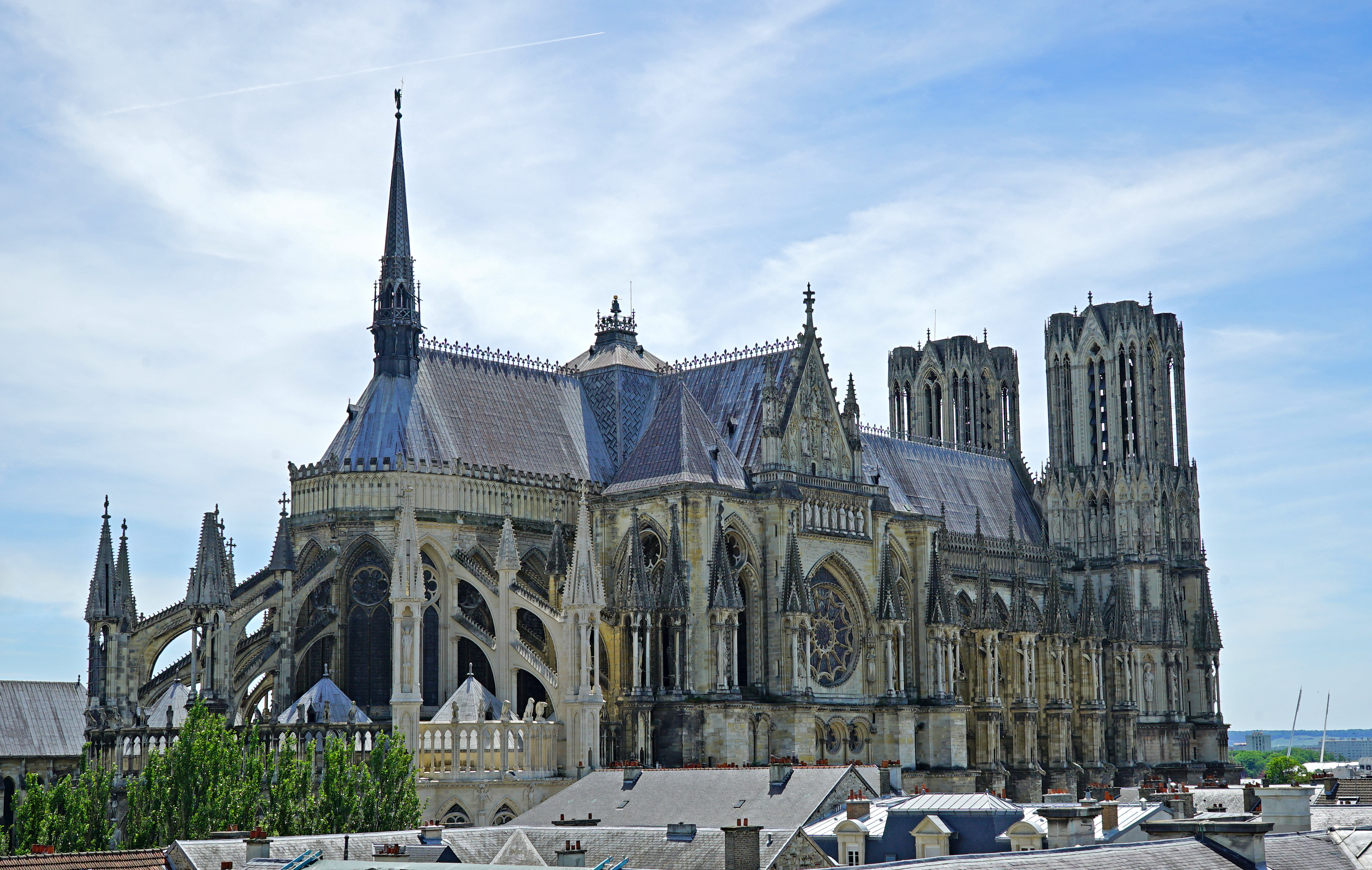
Reims Cathedral from the northeast

Reims Cathedral, with the bar tracery of the chapels of its ambulatory, marks the onset of High Gothic. It was the traditional site of the coronation of the Capetian dynasty and for that reason was given special grandeur and importance. A fire in 1210 destroyed much of the old cathedral, giving an opportunity to build a more ambitious structure, the work began in 1211, but was interrupted by a local rebellion in 1233, and not resumed until 1236. The choir was finished by 1241, but work on the facade did not begin until 1252, and was not finished until the 15th century, with the completion of the bell towers.

Concerning vaults and elevations, Reims Cathedral followed the scheme of Chartres cathedral, but it had an innovation of the columns, each of which was surrounded by a cluster of four attached columns that received the weight of the vaults. In addition to the large rose window on the west, smaller rose windows were added to the transepts and over the portals on the west facade, taking the place of the traditional tympanum. Another new decorative feature.

The west façade was built after 1252, when the ground for the construction of the towers had been bought. The design of its windows was more advanced than in transept and nave and already fits the criteria of Rayonnant Gothic, as the glass of the rose windows exceeds their circular frames. Also the style of the sculpture was more vivid, the smiling angels are famous. Blind tracery was attached to both interior walls and the facade. Even the flying buttresses were given elaborate decoration; they were crowned by small tabernacles containing statues of saints, which were topped with pinnacles. More than 2300 statues covered both the front and the back side of the facade.

Reims Cathedral

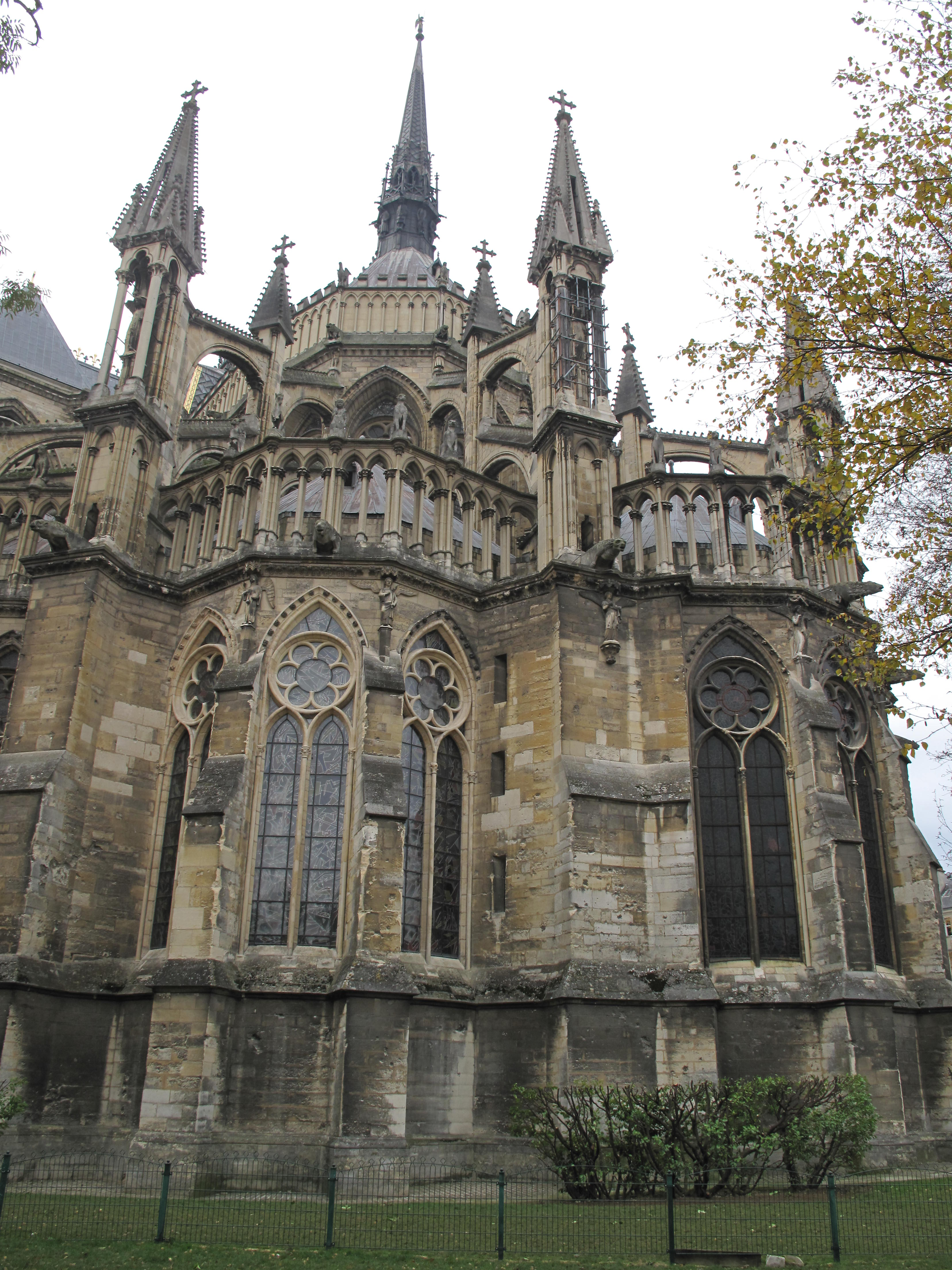
Apse – fine tracery of the chapels

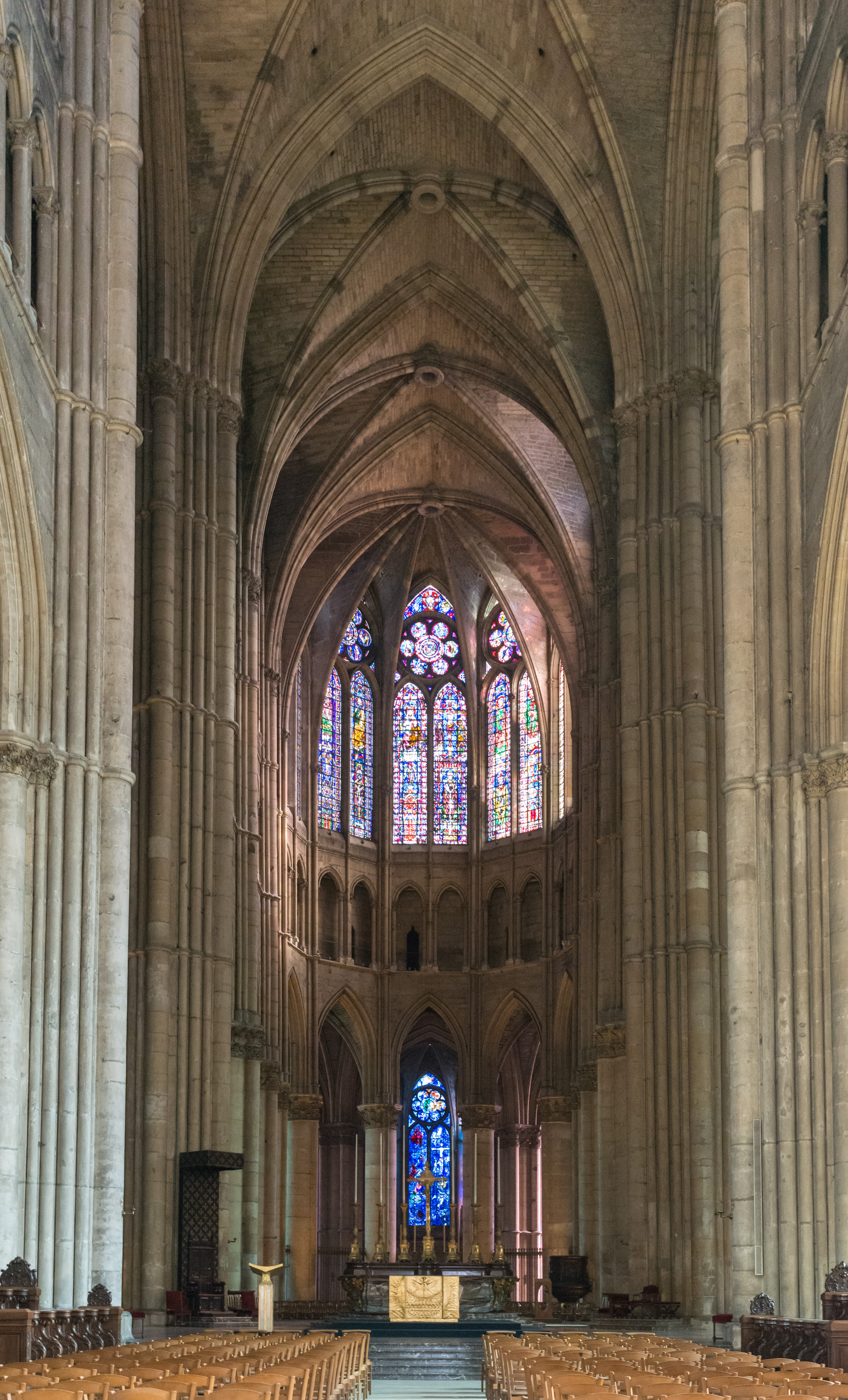
Choir with fine tracery but dark triforium

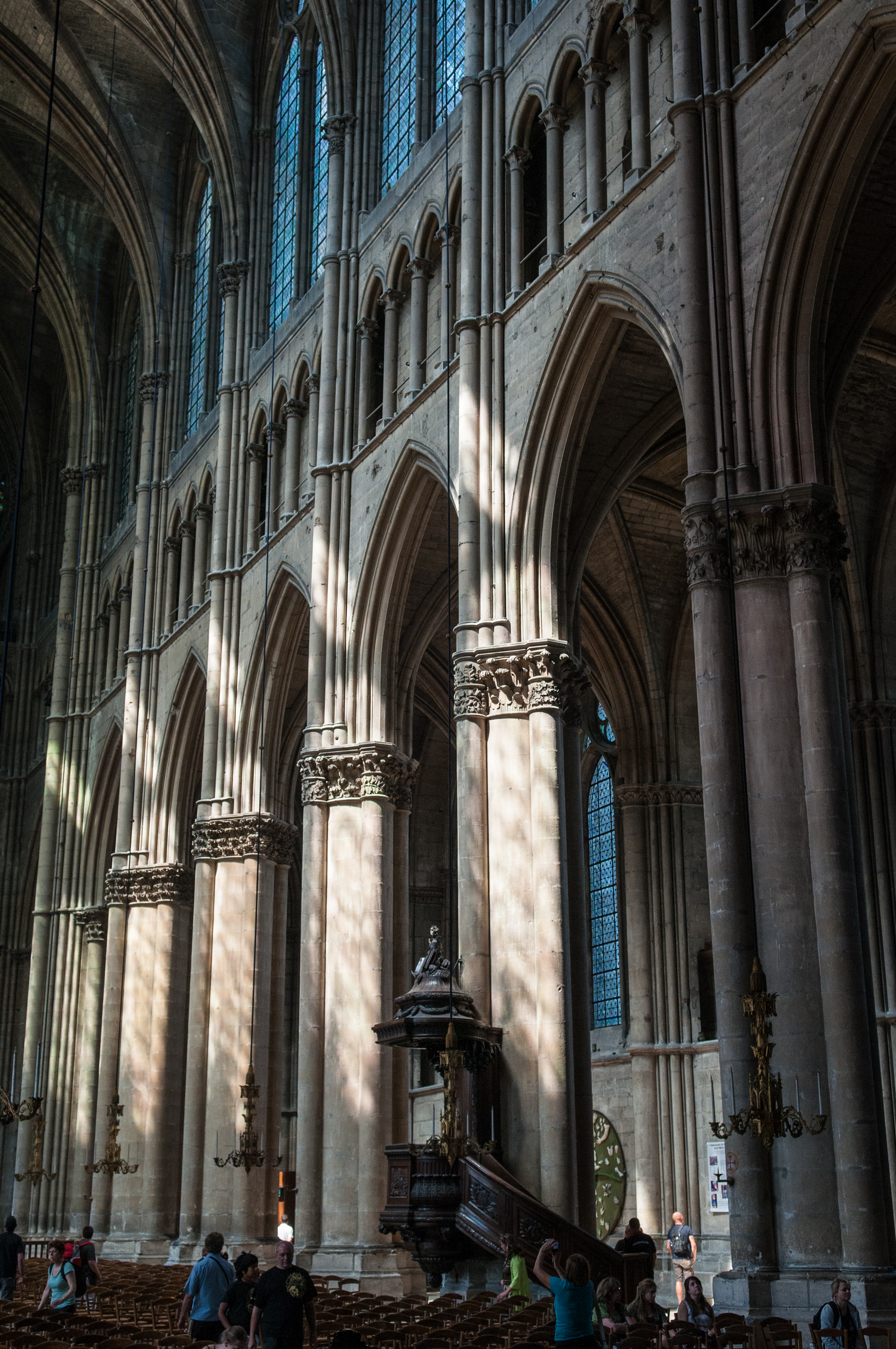
Arcade, dark triforium and clerestory of the nave

=== Amiens Cathedral (1220–1266) ===
Amiens Cathedral was begun in 1220 with its western parts, because the choir of this large building afforded an enlargement of the circle of the defensive walls of the city. Its western pars, almost contemporary with the choir of Reims Cathedral has the characteristics of Classic Gothic. The choir, begun in 1236, but mainly erected after 1258, already fits the criteria of Rayonnant Style.

Amiens Cathedral

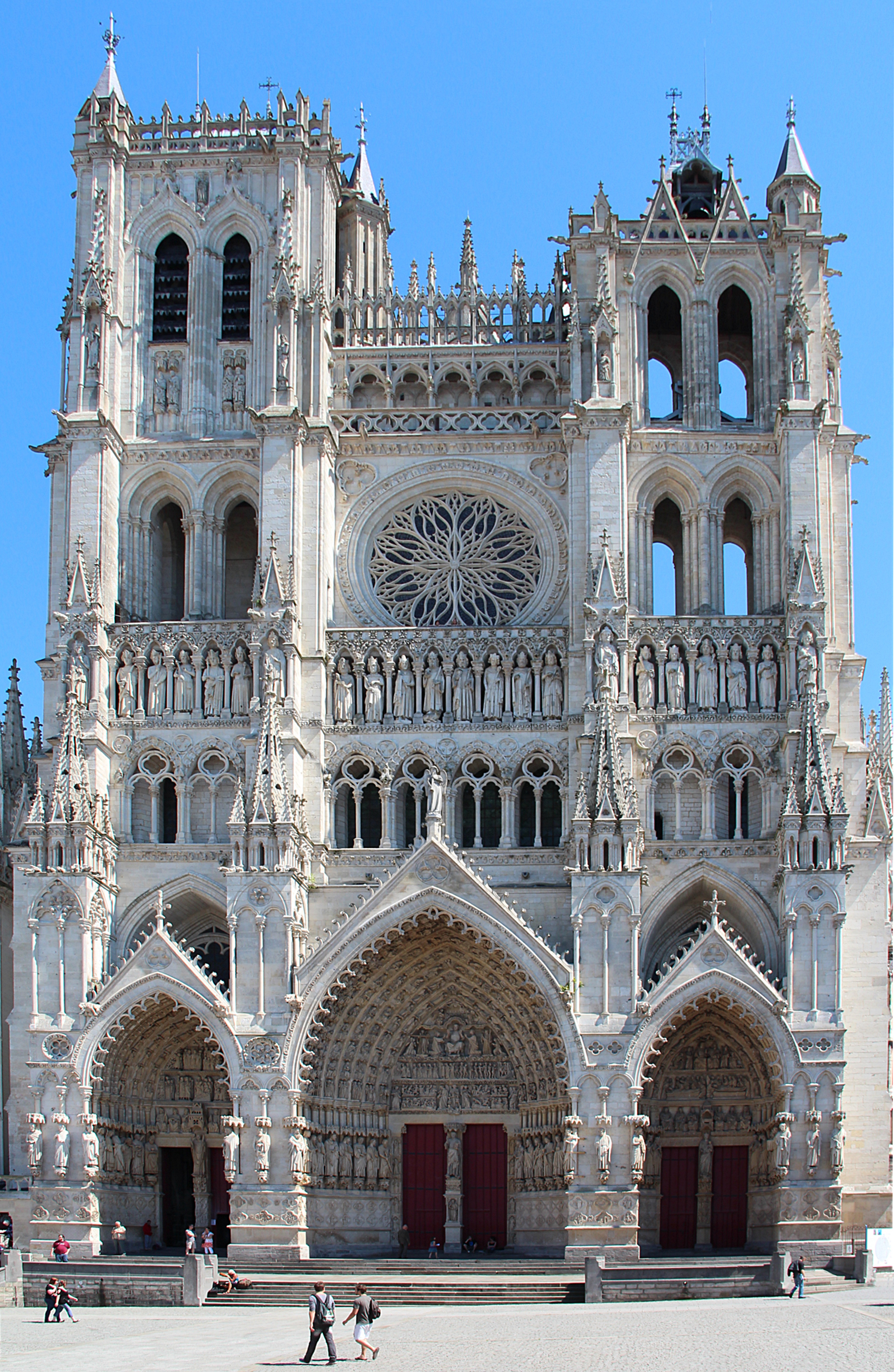
West façade

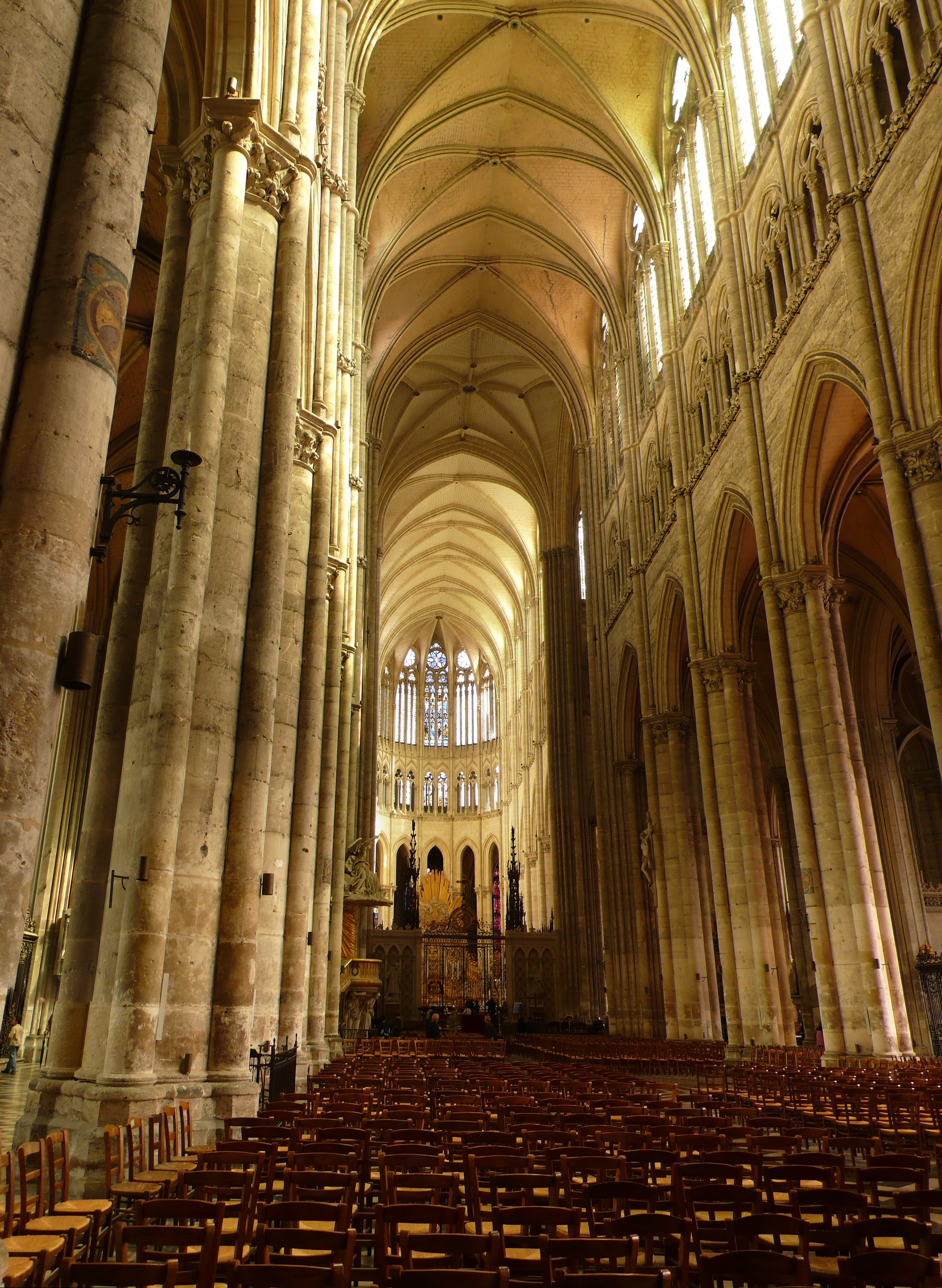
Nave (before 1235) with dark triforia

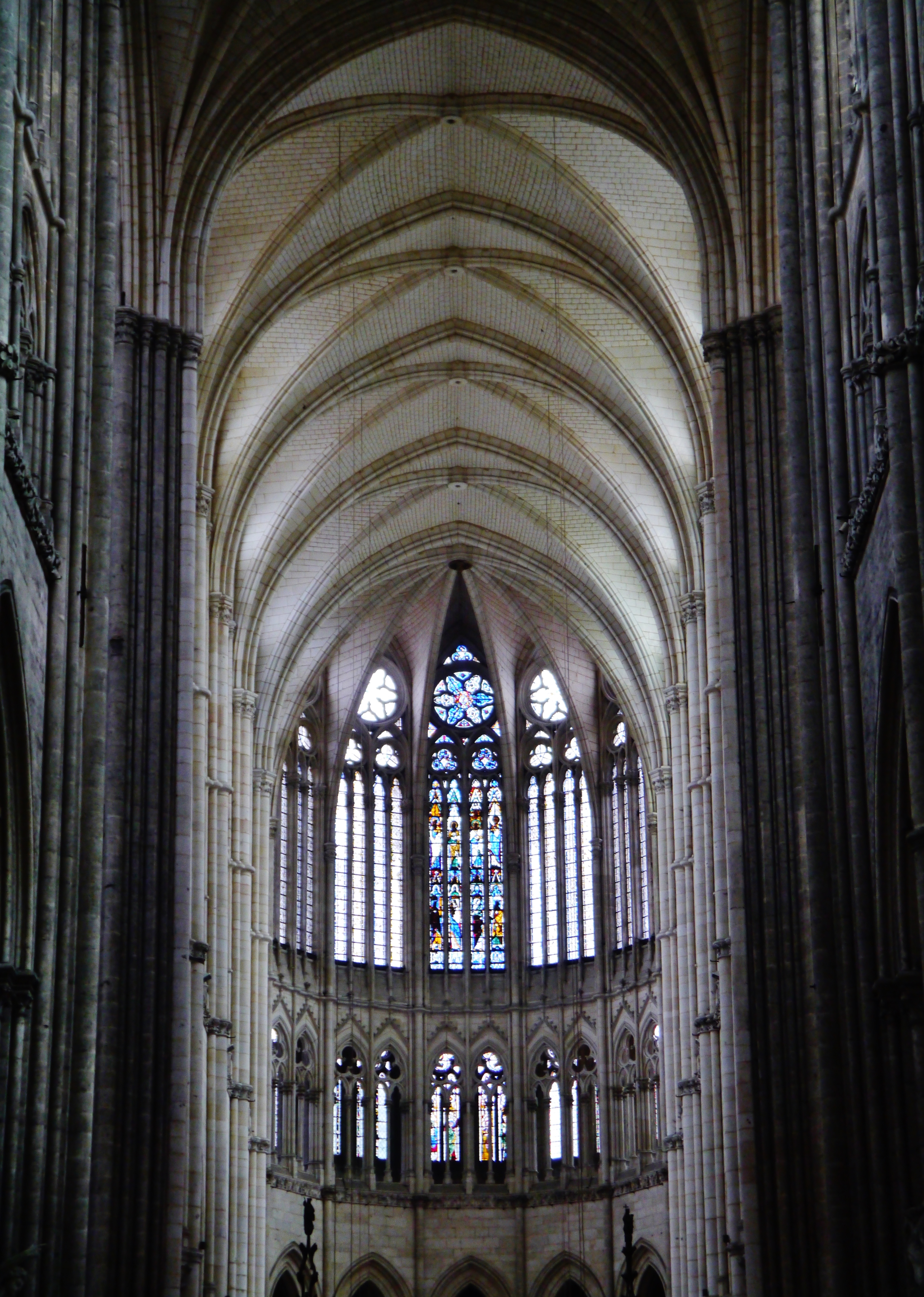
Rayonnant choir (after 1236) with lit triforium

== Plans and cross sections ==
In some western bays of their choirs, these large cathedrals have double aisles of equal heights on each side. Their transepts consist of three (traverse) vessels. Chartres Cathedral has a double ambulatory around the head of the choir, its inner and outer aisles of the same heights.

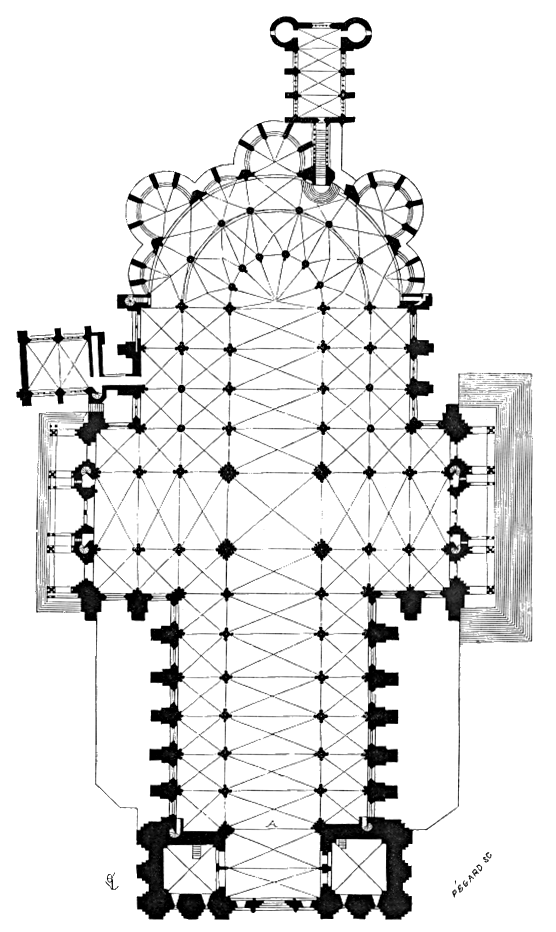
Chartres Cathedral (1194–1260)

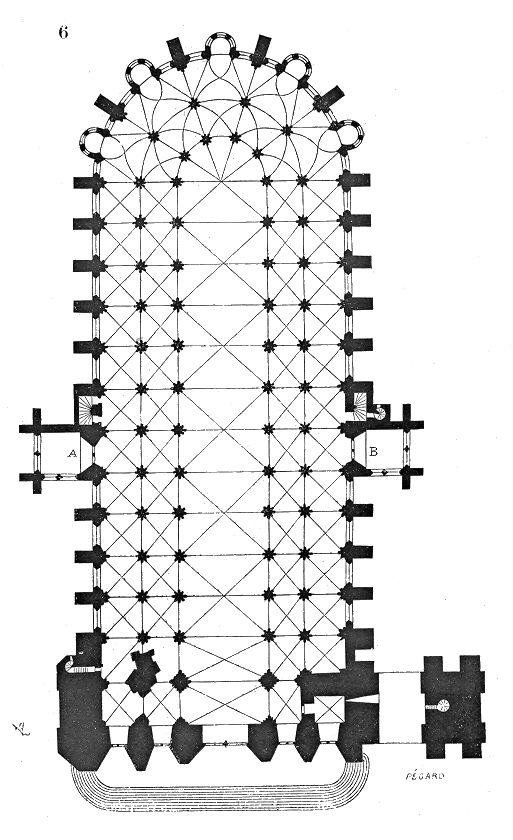
Bourges Cathedral (1195–1230)

Reims Cathedral, begun in 1211

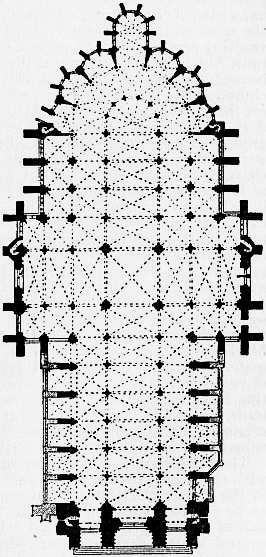
Amiens Cathedral, begun in 1220

As a special feature, Bourges Cathedral, begun in 1195, has no transept, in spite of its length. Its cross section is more complicated than that of Chartres Cathedral. It did not seek a visual unification of the nave, but rather greater diversity. The nave was taller than the inner side aisles, and these taller than the outer side aisles. The elevations of each vessel had three levels, which did not match with the others. Thus the naves and aisles had separate galleries, triforia and clerestories of different heights, or five different levels in all. This same system was adapted at Le Mans Cathedral and Coutances Cathedral in France and Toledo Cathedral and Burgos Cathedral in Spain.

== Sculpture ==
Sculpture was an integral element of Gothic architecture. It followed upon and expanded the use of sculpture by Romanesque builders. Sculpture filled with tympanum over the central portal occupied the columns and was placed in niches higher on the facade. The subjects were essentially the same on each cathedral; Saints, apostles, and Kings. At the end of the 12th century, their poses were very formal, and the faces rarely seemed to be looking at each other or at anyone else. The greatest variety was usually in their drapery, which could be highly stylised or natural. However, in the 13th century, the faces and figures became much more vivid and expressive.

The sculpture of Chartres Cathedral was an influential step towards the sculpture of High Gothic cathedrals. The sculpture of the west porch or royal portal is the oldest, dating to the late 12th century before the 1194 fire. The main themes are the descent of Christ to the earth; his ascension, and the apocalypse, or day of judgement, illustrated by almost two hundred small figures. The stories are not told in chronological order, but follow a certain path; they begin to the left of the central door, go to the left as far as the south tower, then continue to the right as far as the north tower. The major figure in the central tympanum is Christ, seated on a throne, rendering judgement. In addition to the tympanum sculpture, the columns also contain statues of figures from the Old Testament. Following the style of the 12th century, the bodies and costumes of the figures are practically ignored; all the skill of the sculptor is used on the expressive faces.

The north porch and south porch sculpture at Chartres is from the beginning of the 13th century and represents the more mature High Gothic style. The principal themes on the north porch are the Old Testament and the life of the Virgin Mary, along with vivid representations of the vices and the virtues. The South porch portrays the acts of Christ with his apostles, and the Christian martyrs, while above the door is a portrayal of the Last Judgement. The figures are crowded into the archivolts over the doorway, The porches also contain statues of confessors, saints, Emperors and Kings in the arcades above the portals. The thirteenth-century figures are portrayed with more emotion and movement. Together, the sculptures of Chartres formed a comprehensive visual retelling of the Old and New Testament, as well as a catalog of virtues to imitate and vices to avoid.

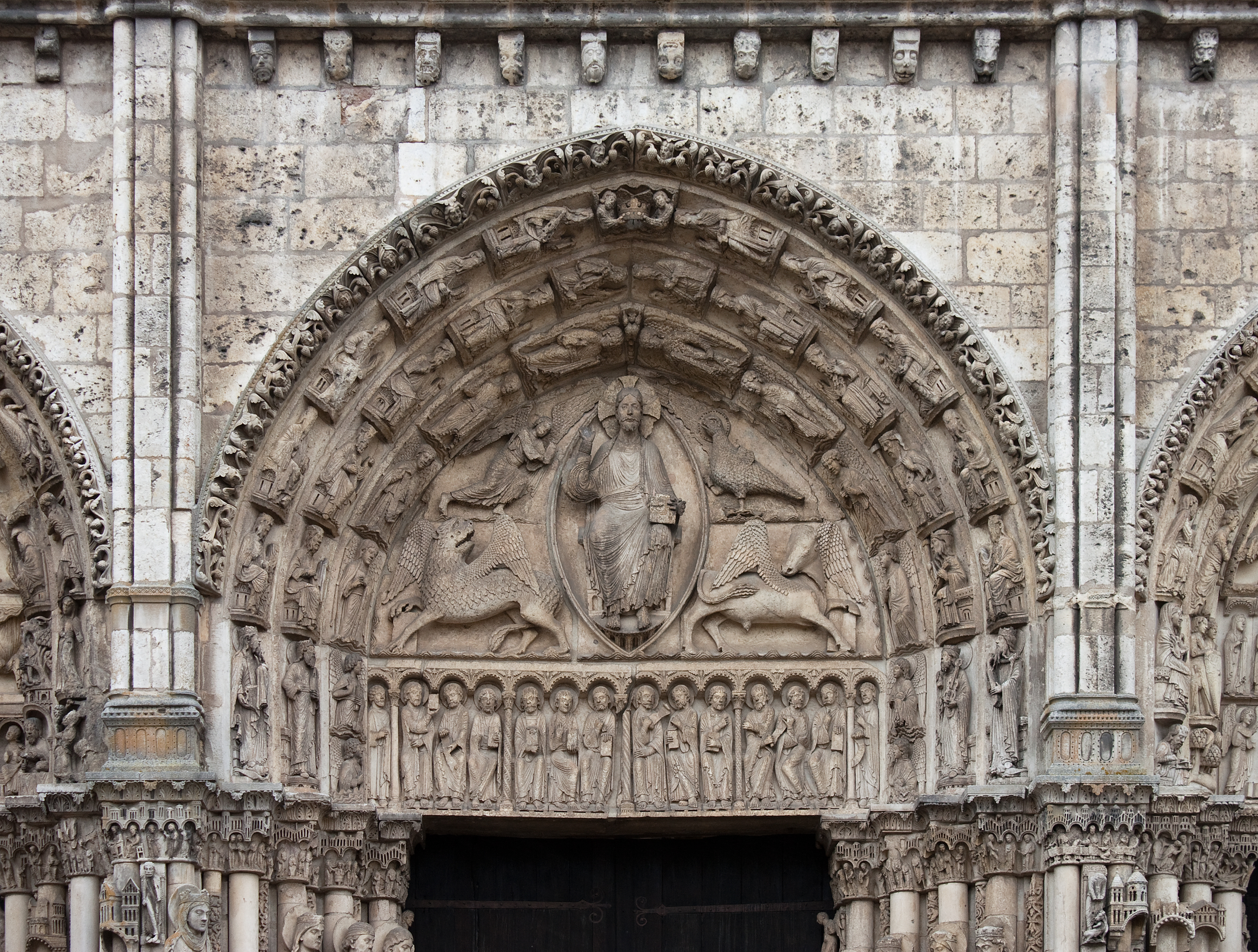
Royal portal tympanum at Chartres Cathedral (end of 12th century)

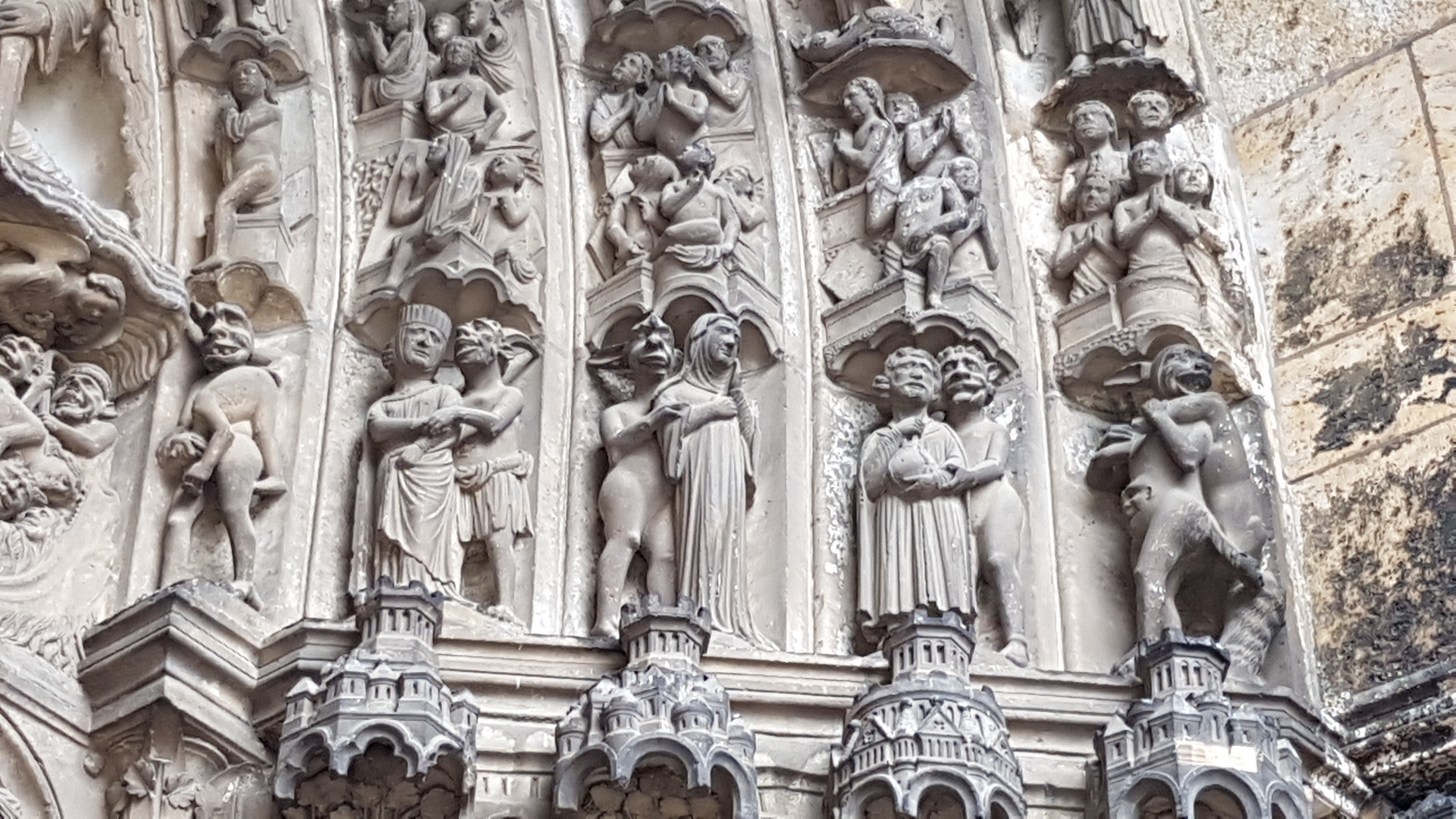
Monsters and devils tempting Christians on the Chartres south portal (early 13th century)

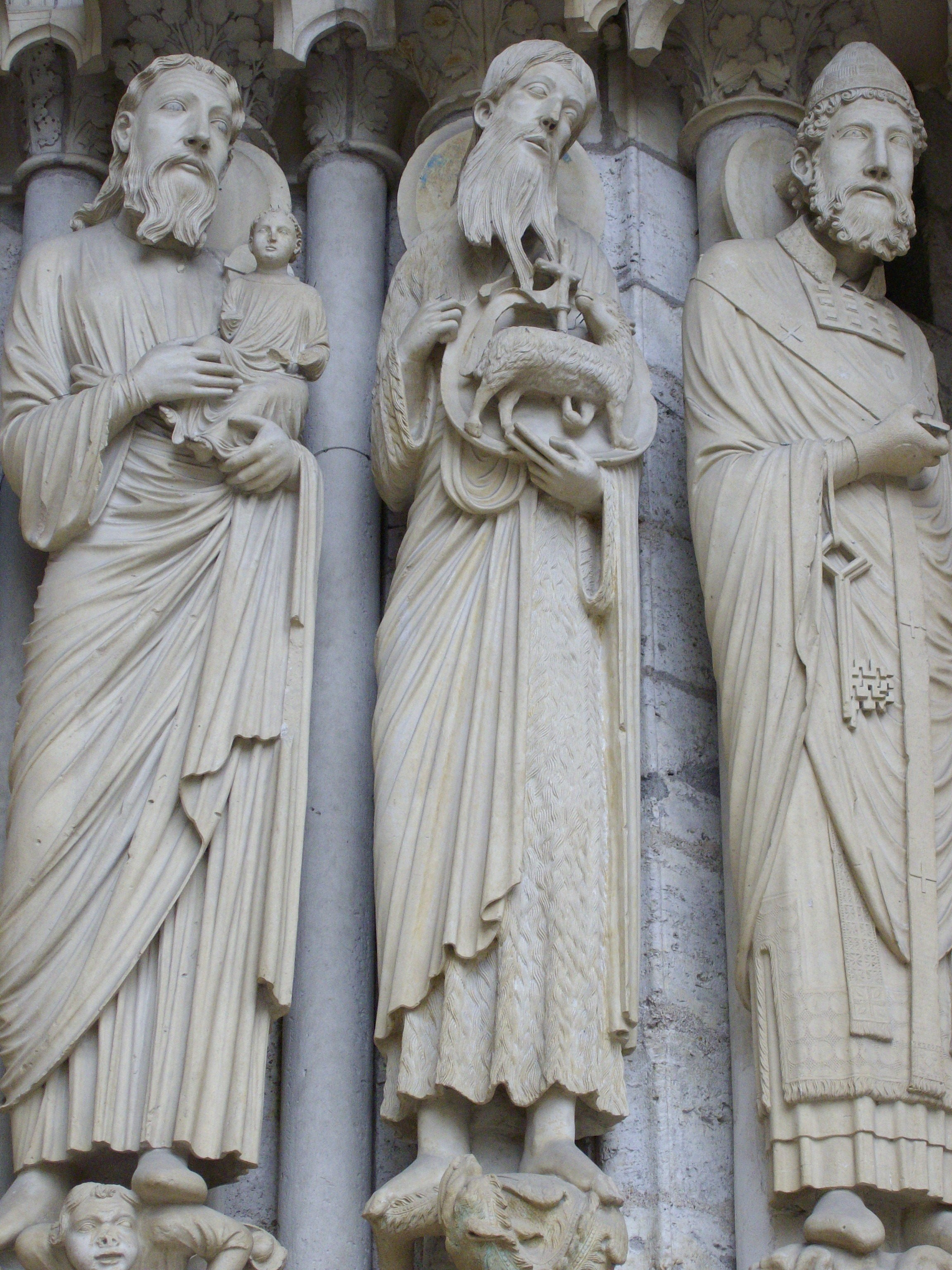
New Testament figures at Chartres Cathedral (early 13th century)
