= Christiane Joost-Gaugier =

French-born American art historian (born 1934)

Christiane L. Joost-Gaugier (born 1934) is a French-born American art history scholar whose research has included work on the art of the Italian Renaissance and on the influence of Pythagoras on art and philosophy into the Middle Ages and Renaissance. She is also known for bringing the first class action against an American university for its discriminatory treatment of women faculty.

== Education and career ==
Joost-Gaugier was born in 1934 in France. She graduated with honors from Radcliffe College in 1955, earned an A.M. there in 1959 and a PhD from Harvard University in 1973. She taught at Michigan State University in the early 1960s, and in the late 1960s joined the Tufts University faculty,. In 1970 she initiated a class action lawsuit against Tufts University for unequal treatment of women. The case was taken up by the Equal Employment Opportunity Commission, eventually decided in her favor, settled in the mid-1980s, and became a significant legal precedent. However, as a consequence of her actions, Joost-Gaugier found herself "harassed and ostracized by her university" and "widely blackballed".

She became a professor and department chair at the following universities: New Mexico State University, the University of New Mexico, and Wayne State University. Joost-Gaugier has lectured internationally and published widely including over 200 research articles. She is the recipient of many awards including a Fulbright Fellowship and grants from the American Society of Learned Societies, the American Philosophical Society, the Delmas Foundation, the National Endowment for the Humanities, and the Kress Foundation. She is responsible for obtaining a grant which commenced the restoration of Minoru Yamasaki's Courtyard in Detroit. Already a three times graduate of Harvard, she received a Lifetime Achievement Award with Phi Beta Kappa from Harvard University in 2005. She now continues her work as an independent scholar.

== Books ==
Joost-Gaugier's books include:

- Jacopo Bellini, Selected Drawings (1982)
- Raphael's Stanza della Segnatura: Meaning and Invention (2002)
- Measuring Heaven: Pythagoras and his Influence on Thought and Art in Antiquity and the Middle Ages (2006; translated into Italian, Pitagora e suo Influsso sul Pensiero e sul Arte 2008)
- Pythagoras and Renaissance Europe: Finding Heaven (2009)
- Italian Renaissance Art: Understanding its Meaning (2013)
- Islamic Elements in the Architecture of Puglia (2019)
