= Notre-Dame de Paris =

Cathedral in Paris, France, built 1163–1345

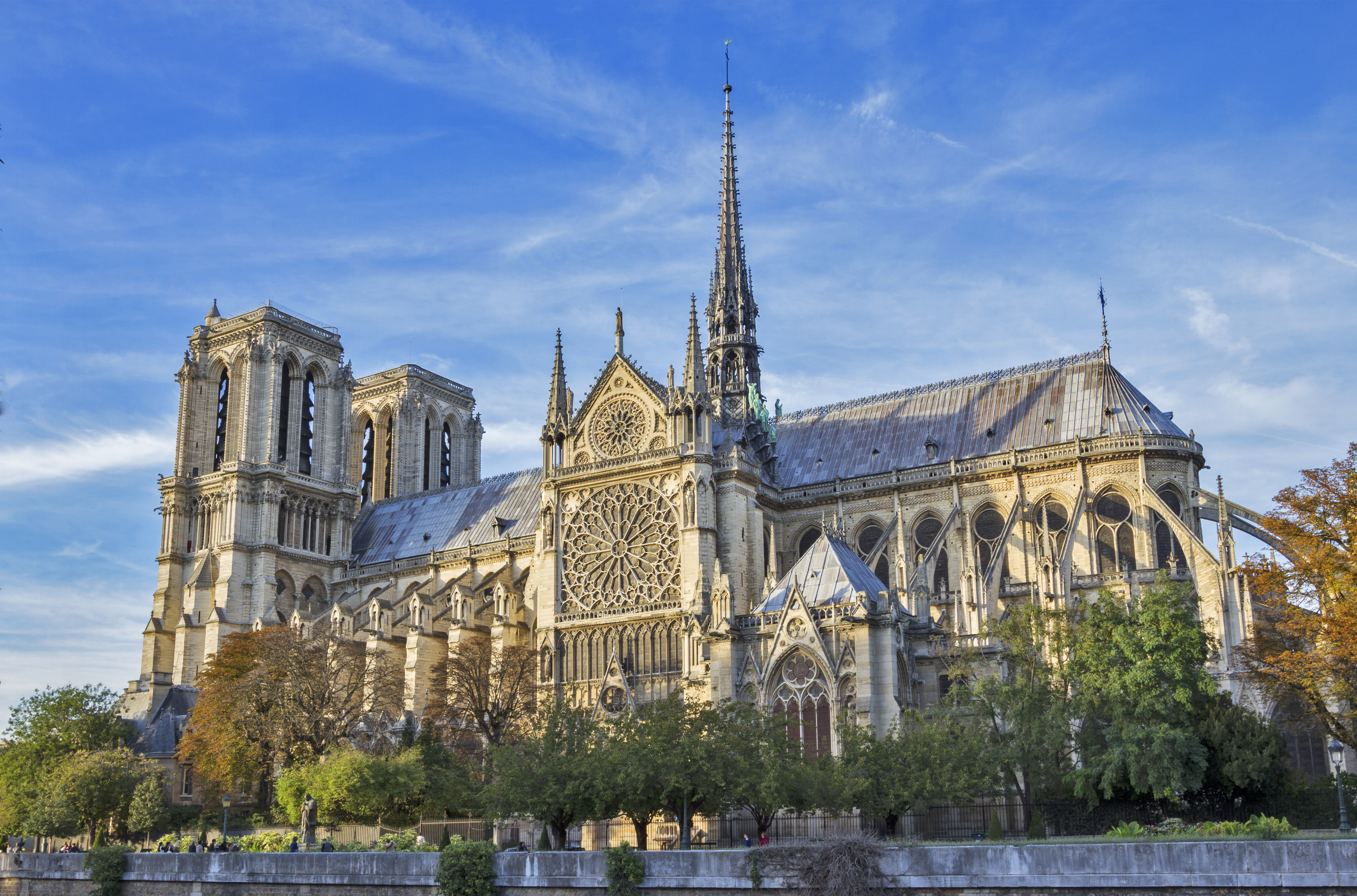
- South façade and the nave of Notre-Dame in 2017, two years before the fire. It was generally restored to this outward appearance by 2024.
- Notre-Dame de Paris
- 48°51′11″N 2°21′00″E
- Location: Parvis Notre-Dame – Place Jean-Paul-II, Paris
- Country: France
- Denomination: Catholic Church
- Sui iuris church: Latin Church
- Website: Official website

History
- Status: Cathedral, minor basilica
- Founded: 24 March 1163 to 25 April 1163 (laying of the cornerstone)
- Founder: Maurice de Sully
- Consecrated: 19 May 1182 (high altar)

Architecture
- Functional status: Active
- Architectural type: Gothic
- Style: French Gothic
- Years built: 1163–1345
- Groundbreaking: 1163; 863 years ago
- Completed: 1345; 681 years ago

Specifications
- Length: 128 m (420 ft)
- Width: 48 m (157 ft)
- Materials: Limestone and marble

Administration
- Archdiocese: Paris

Clergy
- Archbishop: Laurent Ulrich
- Rector: Olivier Ribadeau Dumas

UNESCO World Heritage Site
- Criteria: I, II, IV
- Designated: 1991
- Part of: Paris, Banks of the Seine
- Reference no.: 600

Monument historique
- Official name: Cathédrale Notre-Dame de Paris
- Type: Cathédrale
- Designated: 1862
- Reference no.: PA00086250

Notre-Dame de Paris (French: Cathédrale Notre-Dame de Paris French: [nɔtʁ(ə) dam də paʁi]: "Cathedral of Our Lady of Paris"), often referred to simply as Notre-Dame, (Note: The name Notre Dame, meaning "Our Lady", was frequently used in names of churches, including the cathedrals of Chartres, Reims and Rouen.) (Note: /ˌnɒtrə ˈdɑːm, ˌnoʊtrə ˈdeɪm, ˌnoʊtrə ˈdɑːm/;) is a medieval Catholic cathedral and basilica on the Île de la Cité (an island in the River Seine), in the 4th arrondissement of Paris, France. It is the cathedral church of the Roman Catholic Archdiocese of Paris.

The cathedral, dedicated to the Virgin Mary ("Our Lady"), is considered one of the finest examples of French Gothic architecture. Several attributes set it apart from the earlier Romanesque style, including its pioneering use of the rib vault and flying buttress, its enormous and colourful rose windows, and the naturalism and abundance of its sculptural decoration. Notre-Dame is also exceptional for its 3 pipe organs (one historic) and its immense church bells.

The construction of the cathedral began in 1163 under Bishop Maurice de Sully and was largely completed by 1260, though it was modified in succeeding centuries. In the 1790s, during the French Revolution, Notre-Dame suffered extensive desecration; much of its religious imagery was damaged or destroyed. In the 19th century, the cathedral hosted the coronation of Napoleon and the funerals of many of the French Republic's presidents. The 1831 publication of Victor Hugo's novel Notre-Dame de Paris (English title: The Hunchback of Notre-Dame) inspired interest which led to restoration between 1844 and 1864, supervised by Eugène Viollet-le-Duc. On 26 August 1944, the Liberation of Paris from German occupation was celebrated in Notre-Dame with the singing of the Magnificat. Beginning in 1963, the cathedral's façade was cleaned of soot and grime. Another cleaning and restoration project was carried out between 1991 and 2000. A fire in April 2019 caused serious damage, closing the cathedral for extensive and costly repairs; it reopened in December 2024.

Notre-Dame is a widely recognised symbol of both the city of Paris and the French nation. In 1805, Pope Pius VII awarded it honorary status as a minor basilica. As the cathedral of the archdiocese of Paris, Notre-Dame contains the cathedra or seat of the archbishop of Paris (currently Laurent Ulrich). In the early 21st century, about 12 million people visited Notre-Dame annually, making it the most visited monument in Paris.

Since 1905, Notre-Dame, like the other cathedrals in France, has been owned by the French government, with the exclusive rights of use granted to the French Roman Catholic Church. The French government is responsible for its maintenance.

Over time, the cathedral has gradually been stripped of many decorations and artworks. It still contains Gothic, Baroque, and 19th-century sculptures, 17th- and early 18th-century altarpieces, and some of the most important relics in Christendom, including the crown of thorns, and a sliver and nail from the True Cross.

== Key dates ==
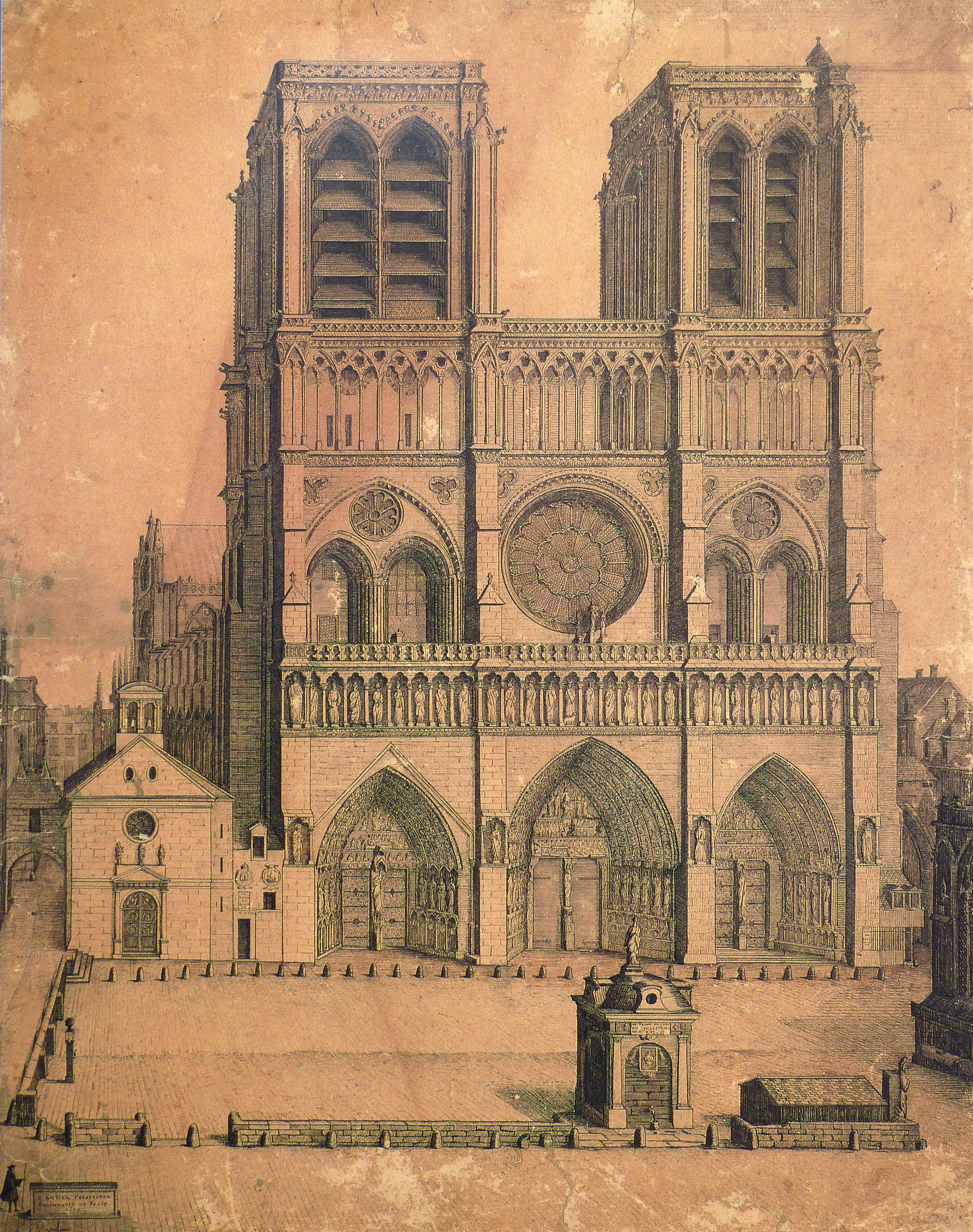
The Cathedral in 1699

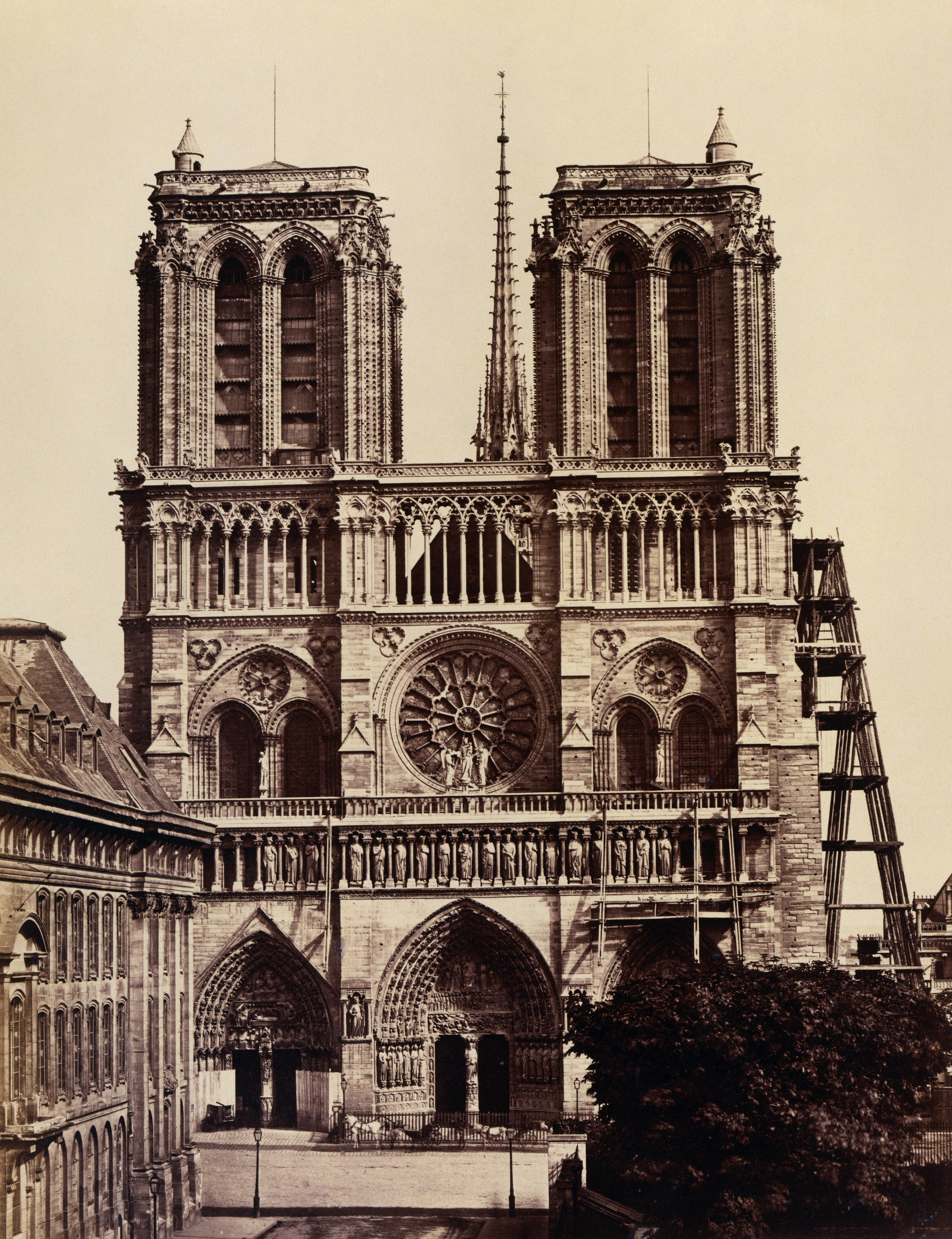
The church restored by Viollet-le-Duc (1860s)

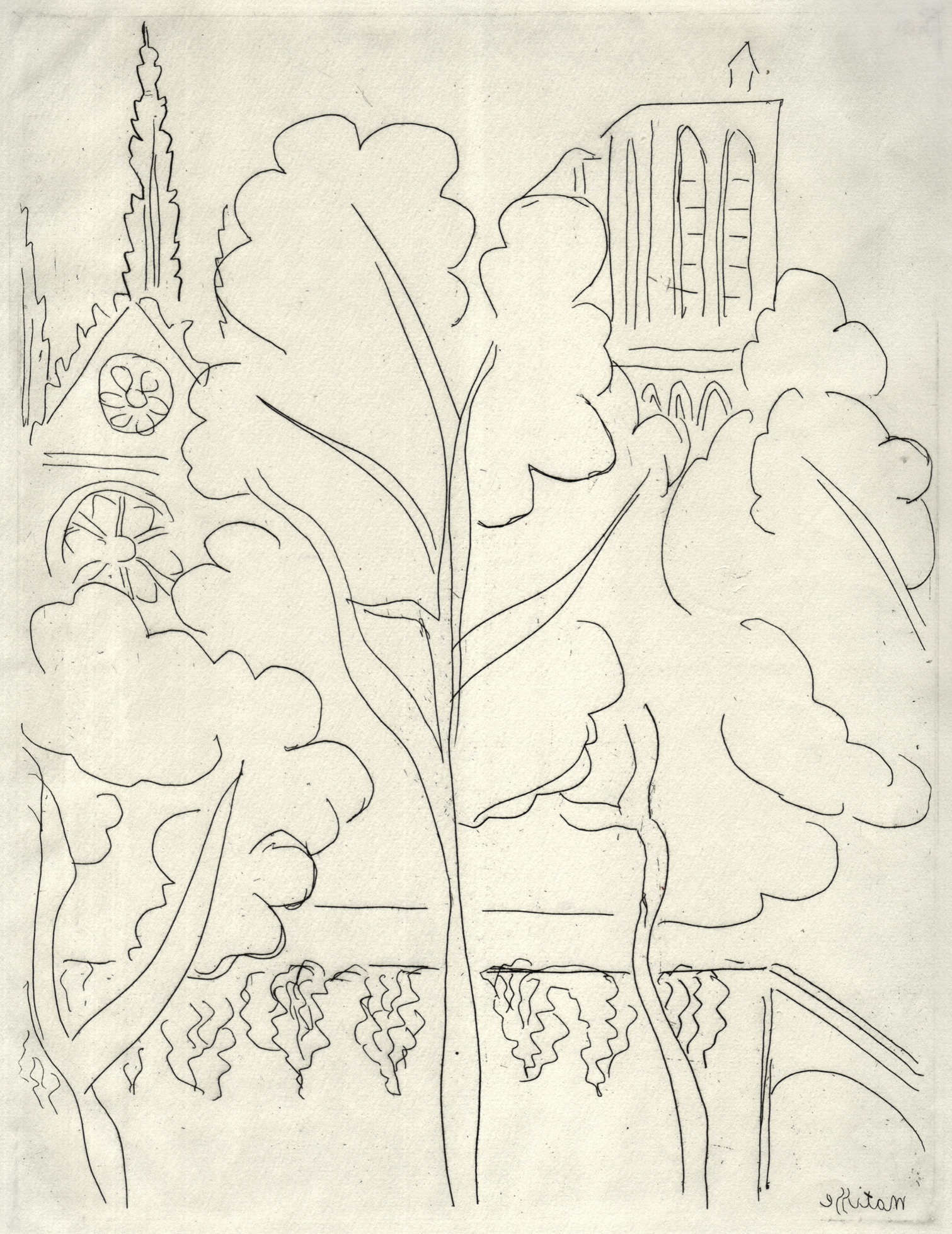
Henri Matisse, Notre-Dame de Paris, 1937, etching

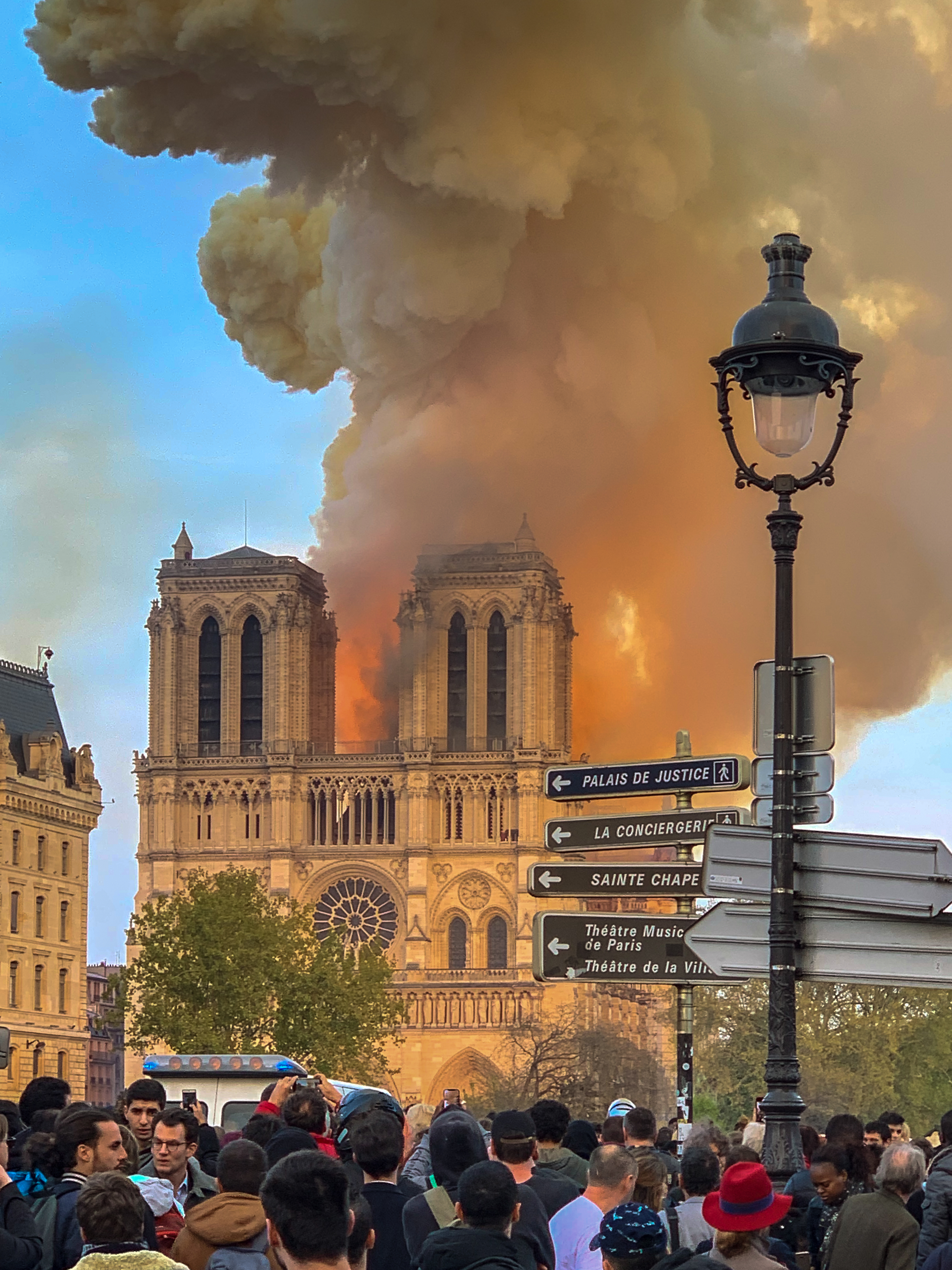
Cathedral fire (April 15 2019)

4th century – Cathedral of Saint Étienne, dedicated to Saint Stephen, built just west of the present cathedral

- 1163 – Bishop Maurice de Sully begins construction of new cathedral.
- 1182 or 1185 – Choir completed, clerestory with two levels: upper level of upright windows with pointed arches, still without tracery, lower level of small rose windows.
- c. 1200 – Construction of nave, with flying buttresses, completed.
- c. 1210–1220 – Construction of towers begins.
- c. 1210–1220 – Two new traverses join towers with nave. West rose window complete in 1220.
- After 1220 – New flying buttresses added to choir walls, remodelling of the clerestories: pointed arched windows are enlarged downward, replacing the triforia, and get tracery.
- 1235–1245 – Chapels constructed between buttresses of nave and choir.
- 1250–1260 – North transept lengthened by Jean de Chelles to provide more light. North rose window constructed.
- 1270 – South transept and rose window completed by Pierre de Montreuil.
- 1699 – Beginning of major redecoration of interior in Louis XIV style by Hardouin Mansart and Robert de Cotte.
- 1725–1727 – South rose window, poorly built, is reconstructed. Later entirely rebuilt in 1854.
- 1790 – In the French Revolution the Revolutionary Paris Commune removes all bronze, lead, and precious metals from the cathedral to be melted down.
- 1793 – The cathedral is converted into a Temple of Reason and then Temple of the Supreme Being.
- 1801–1802 – With the Concordat of 1801, Napoleon restores the use of the cathedral (though not ownership) to the Catholic Church.
- 1804 – On 2 December, Napoleon crowns himself Emperor at Notre-Dame.
- 1844–1864 – Major restoration by Jean-Baptiste Lassus and Eugène Viollet-le-Duc with additions in the spirit of the original Gothic style.
- 1871 – In the final days of the Paris Commune, the Communards prepared to burn the cathedral, but abandoned their plan since it would necessarily also burn the crowded neighboring hospital for the elderly.
- 1944 – On 26 August, General Charles de Gaulle celebrates the Liberation of Paris with a special Mass at Notre-Dame.
- 1963 – Culture Minister André Malraux begins the cleaning of centuries of grime and soot from the cathedral façade.
- 2019 – On 15 April, a fire destroys a large part of the roof and the flèche.
- 2021 – Reconstruction begins and lasted 3 years.
- 2024 – Reopening ceremonies 7–8 December. On 13 December 2024 the Crown of Thorns relic was returned to the cathedral.

== History ==
Outline of the primitive Cathedral of Notre-Dame in 1150, on the spot of the nave, the transept and the choir of the current building. The Cathedral of Saint Étienne was located to the west, at the level of today's parvis.

Construction sequence from 12th century to present-day, created by Stephen Murray and Myles Zhang

It is believed that before the arrival of Christianity in France, a Gallo-Roman temple dedicated to Jupiter stood on the site of Notre-Dame. Evidence for this includes the Pillar of the Boatmen, discovered beneath the cathedral in 1710. In the 4th or 5th century, a large early Christian church, the Cathedral of Saint Étienne, was built on the site, close to the royal palace. The entrance was situated about 40 metres (130 ft) west of the present west front of Notre-Dame, and the apse was located about where the west façade is today. It was roughly half the size of the later Notre-Dame, 70 metres (230 ft) long—and separated into nave and four aisles by marble columns, then decorated with mosaics.

The last church before the cathedral of Notre-Dame was a Romanesque remodelling of Saint-Étienne that, although enlarged and remodelled, was found to be unfit for the growing population of Paris. (Note: The growth of the population of Paris and other French cities was characteristic of Western Europe during the Renaissance of the 12th century. It is thought that the population of Paris grew from 25,000 in 1180 to 50,000 in 1220, making it the largest European city outside of Italy.) A baptistery, the Church of Saint-John-le-Rond, built about 452, was located on the north side of the west front of Notre-Dame until the work of Jacques-Germain Soufflot in the 18th century.

In 1160, the bishop of Paris, Maurice de Sully, decided to build a new and much larger church. He summarily demolished the earlier cathedral and recycled its materials. Sully decided that the new church should be built in the Gothic style, which had been inaugurated at the royal abbey of Saint Denis in the late 1130s.

=== Construction ===
The chronicler Jean de Saint-Victor recorded in the Memorial Historiarum that the construction of Notre-Dame began between 24 March and 25 April 1163 with the laying of the cornerstone in the presence of King Louis VII and Pope Alexander III. Four phases of construction took place under bishops Maurice de Sully and Eudes de Sully (not related to Maurice), according to masters whose names have been lost. Analysis of vault stones that fell in the 2019 fire shows that they were quarried in Vexin, a county northwest of Paris, and presumably brought up the Seine by boat.

Five years after the devastating fire, Notre-Dame de Paris formally reopened with a two-hour ceremony inside its newly renovated interior following an estimated $739 million restoration. This was then followed by an event that was attended by global leaders including French president Emmanuel Macron and US president-elect Donald Trump. This celebration honoured the successful completion of the 2,000-plus day rebuilding effort that destroyed the spire and wooden roof structure. Macron hailed the cathedral as a metaphor for the nation's ability to "accomplish the impossible".

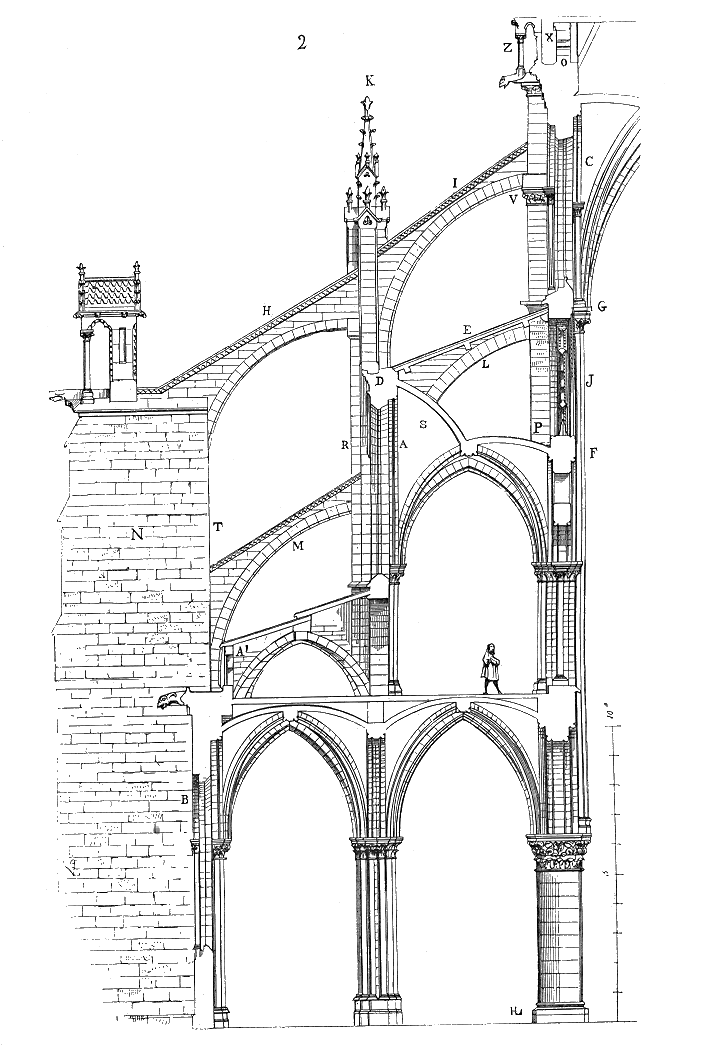
Cross-section of the double supporting arches and buttresses of the nave, drawn by Eugène Viollet-le-Duc as they would have appeared from 1220 to 1230

The first phase began with the construction of the choir and its two ambulatories. According to Robert of Torigni, the choir was completed in 1177 and the high altar consecrated on 19 May 1182 by Cardinal Henri de Château-Marçay, the Papal legate in Paris, and Maurice de Sully. The second phase, from 1182 to 1190, concerned the construction of the four sections of the nave behind the choir and its aisles to the height of the clerestories. It began after the completion of the choir but ended before the final allotted section of the nave was finished. Beginning in 1190, the bases of the façade were put in place, and the first traverses were completed. Patriarch Heraclius of Jerusalem called for the Third Crusade in 1185 from the still-incomplete cathedral.

Saint Louis IX deposited the relics of the passion of Christ, which included the crown of thorns, a nail from the True Cross and a sliver of the True Cross, which he had purchased at great expense from the Latin Emperor Baldwin II, in the cathedral during the construction of the Sainte-Chapelle. An under-shirt, believed to have belonged to Louis, was added to the collection of relics at some time after his death.

Transepts were added at the choir, where the altar was located, in order to bring more light into the centre of the church. The use of simpler four-part rather than six-part rib vaults meant that the roofs were stronger and could be higher. After Bishop Maurice de Sully's death in 1196, his successor, Eudes de Sully oversaw the completion of the transepts, and continued work on the nave, which was nearing completion at the time of his death in 1208. By this time, the western façade was already largely built; it was completed around the mid-1240s. Between 1225 and 1250 the upper gallery of the nave was constructed, along with the two towers on the west façade.

Arrows show forces in vault and current flying buttresses (detailed description)

Another significant change came in the mid-13th century, when the transepts were remodelled in the latest Rayonnant style; in the late 1240s Jean de Chelles added a gabled portal to the north transept topped by a spectacular rose window. Shortly afterward (from 1258) Pierre de Montreuil executed a similar scheme on the southern transept. Both these transept portals were richly embellished with sculpture; the south portal depicts scenes from the lives of Saint Stephen and of various local saints, and the north portal features the infancy of Christ and the story of Theophilus in the tympanum, with a highly influential statue of the Virgin and Child in the trumeau. Master builders Pierre de Chelles, Jean Ravy, Jean le Bouteiller, and Raymond du Temple succeeded de Chelles and de Montreuil and then each other in the construction of the cathedral. Ravy completed de Chelles's rood screen and chevet chapels, then began the 15-metre (49 ft) flying buttresses of the choir. Jean le Bouteiller, Ravy's nephew, succeeded him in 1344 and was himself replaced on his death in 1363 by his deputy, Raymond du Temple.

Philip the Fair opened the first Estates General in the cathedral in 1302.

An important innovation in the 12th century was the introduction of the flying buttress. Before the buttresses, all of the weight of the roof pressed outward and down to the walls, and the abutments supporting them. With the flying buttress, the weight was carried by the ribs of the vault entirely outside the structure to a series of counter-supports, which were topped with stone pinnacles which gave them greater weight. The buttresses meant that the walls could be higher and thinner, and could have larger windows. The date of the first buttresses is not known with precision beyond an installation date in the 12th century. Art historian Andrew Tallon has argued, based on detailed laser scans of the entire structure, that the buttresses were part of the original design. According to Tallon, the scans indicate that "the upper part of the building has not moved one smidgen in 800 years," whereas if they were added later some movement from prior to their addition would be expected. Tallon thus concluded that flying buttresses were present from the outset. The first buttresses were replaced by larger and stronger ones in the 14th century; these had a reach of fifteen metres (50 ft) between the walls and counter-supports.

John of Jandun recognized the cathedral as one of Paris's three most important buildings [prominent structures] in his 1323 Treatise on the Praises of Paris:

That most glorious church of the most glorious Virgin Mary, mother of God, deservedly shines out, like the sun among stars. And although some speakers, by their own free judgment, because [they are] able to see only a few things easily, may say that some other is more beautiful, I believe, however, respectfully, that, if they attend more diligently to the whole and the parts, they will quickly retract this opinion. Where indeed, I ask, would they find two towers of such magnificence and perfection, so high, so large, so strong, clothed round about with such multiple varieties of ornaments? Where, I ask, would they find such a multipartite arrangement of so many lateral vaults, above and below? Where, I ask, would they find such light-filled amenities as the many surrounding chapels? Furthermore, let them tell me in what church I may see such a large cross, of which one arm separates the choir from the nave. Finally, I would willingly learn where [there are] two such circles, situated opposite each other in a straight line, which on account of their appearance are given the name of the fourth vowel [O]; among which smaller orbs and circles, with wondrous artifice, so that some arranged circularly, others angularly, surround windows ruddy with precious colours and beautiful with the most subtle figures of the pictures. In fact, I believe that this church offers the carefully discerning such cause for admiration that its inspection can scarcely sate the soul.

— Jean de Jandun, Tractatus de laudibus Parisius

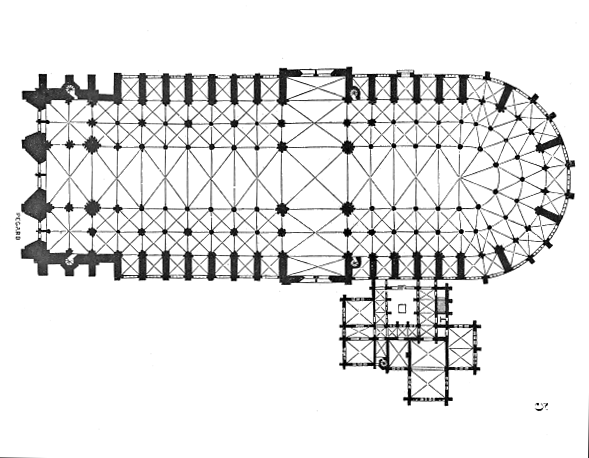
Plan of the cathedral made by Viollet-le-Duc in the 19th century. Portals and nave to the left, a choir in the center, and apse and ambulatory to the right. The annex to the south is the sacristy.

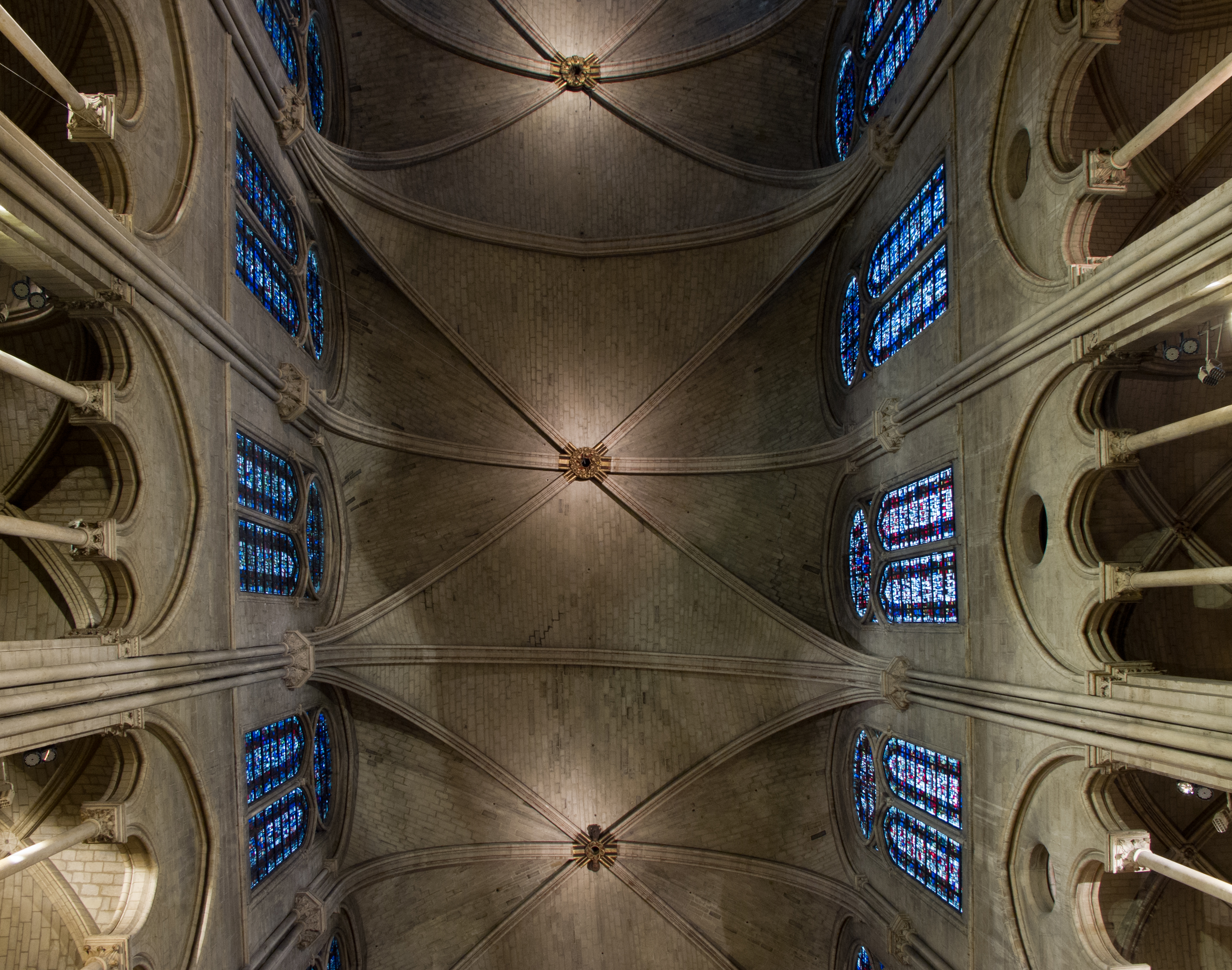
Early six-part rib vaults of the nave. The ribs transferred the thrust of the weight of the roof downward and outwards to the pillars and the supporting buttresses.

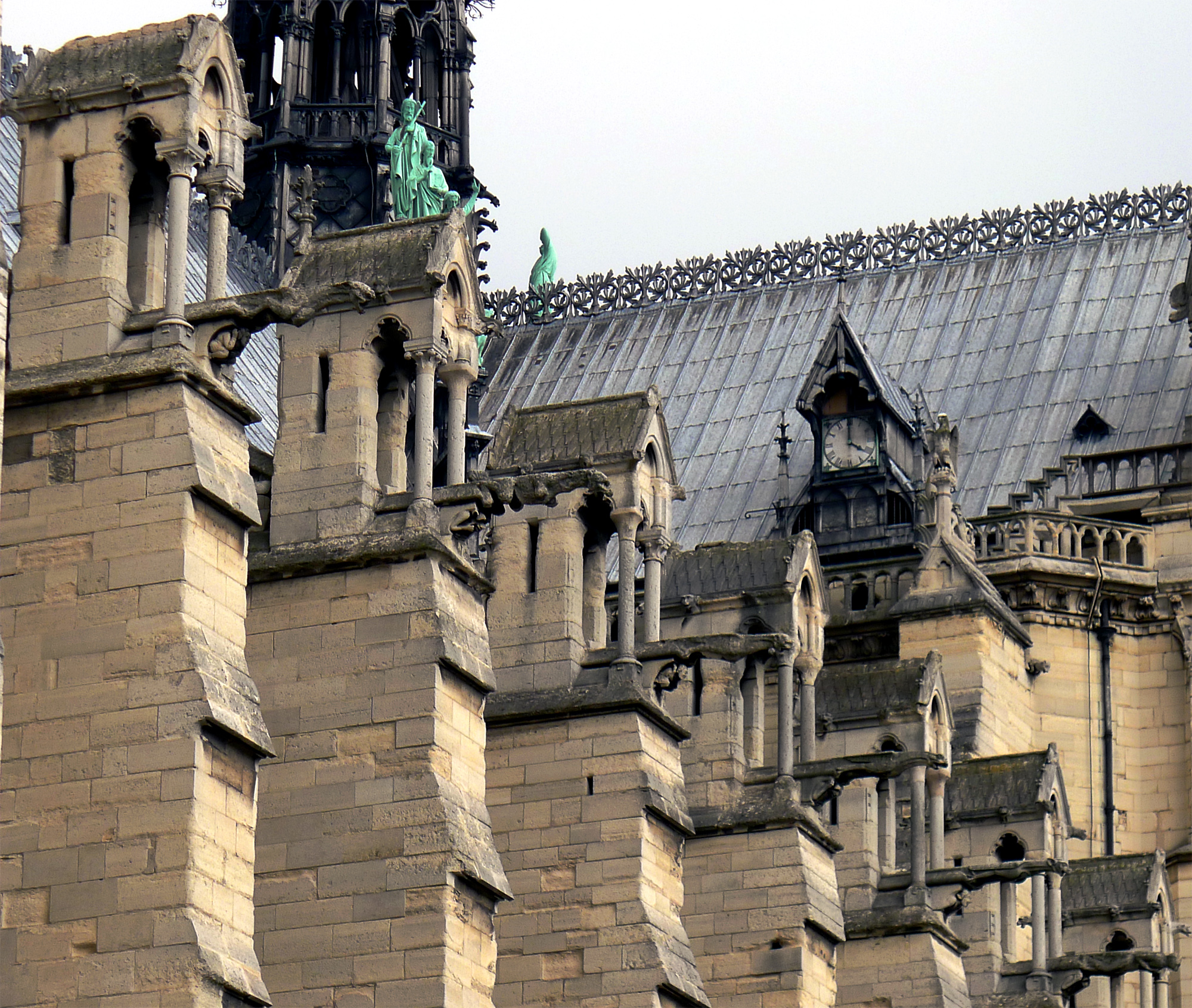
The massive buttresses which counter the outward thrust from the rib vaults of the nave. The weight of the building-shaped pinnacles helps keep the line of thrust safely within the buttresses.

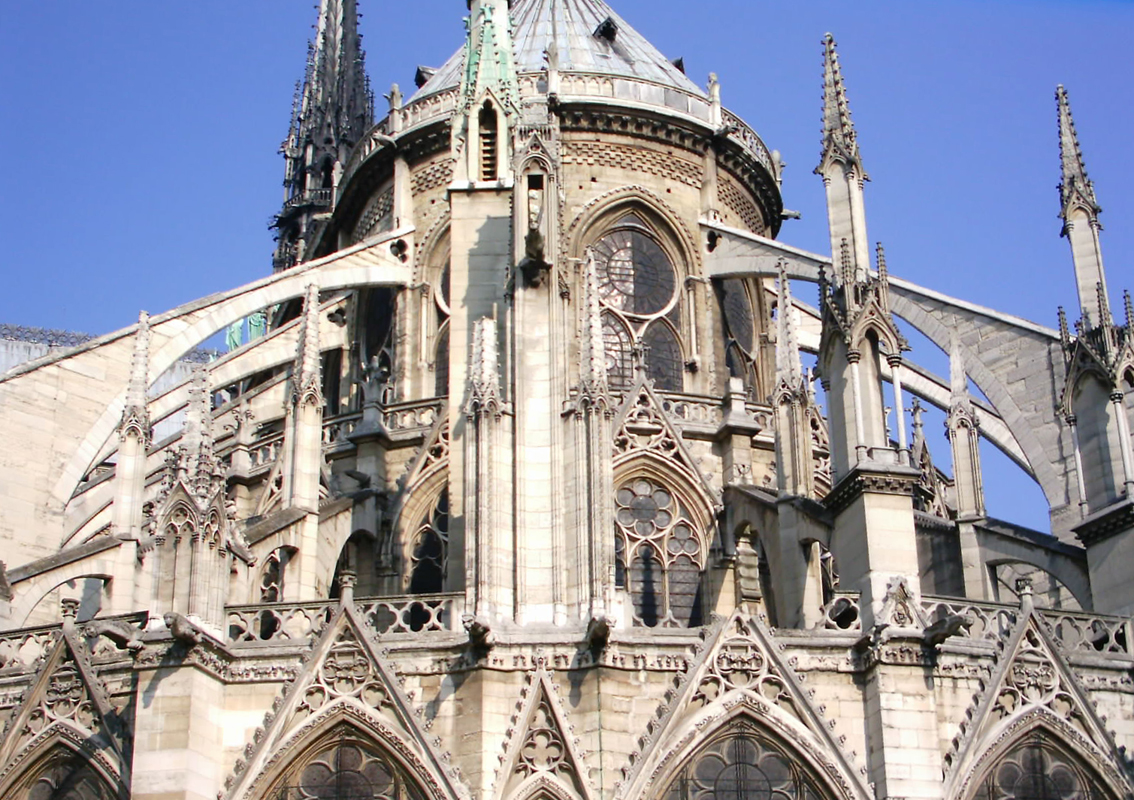
Later flying buttresses of the apse of Notre-Dame (14th century) reached 15 metres (49 ft) from the wall to the counter-supports.

=== 15th–18th century ===
On 16 December 1431, the boy-king Henry VI of England was crowned king of France in Notre-Dame, aged ten, the traditional coronation church of Reims Cathedral being under French control.

During the Renaissance, the Gothic style fell out of style, and the internal pillars and walls of Notre-Dame were covered with tapestries.

In 1548, rioting Huguenots damaged some of the statues of Notre-Dame, considering them idolatrous.

The fountain in Notre-Dame's parvis was added in 1625 to provide nearby Parisians with running water.

Since 1449, the Parisian goldsmith guild had made regular donations to the cathedral chapter. In 1630, the guild began donating a large altarpiece every year on 1 May. These works came to be known as the grands mays. The subject matter was restricted to episodes from the Acts of the Apostles. The prestigious commission was awarded to the most prominent painters and, after 1648, members of the Académie Royale.

Seventy-six paintings had been donated by 1708, when the custom was discontinued for financial reasons. Those works were confiscated in 1793 and the majority were subsequently dispersed among regional museums in France. Those that remained in the cathedral were removed or relocated within the building by the 19th-century restorers.

Thirteen of the grands mays hang in Notre-Dame; these paintings suffered water damage during the fire of 2019 and were removed for conservation.

An altarpiece depicting The Visitation, painted by Jean Jouvenet in 1707, was also in the cathedral.

The canon Antoine de La Porte commissioned for Louis XIV six paintings depicting the life of the Virgin Mary for the choir. At this same time, Charles de La Fosse painted his Adoration of the Magi, now in the Louvre. Louis Antoine de Noailles, archbishop of Paris, extensively modified the roof of Notre-Dame in 1726, renovating its framing and removing the gargoyles with lead gutters. Noailles also strengthened the buttresses, galleries, terraces, and vaults. In 1756, the cathedral's canons decided that its interior was too dark. The medieval stained-glass windows, except the rosettes, were removed and replaced with plain, white glass panes. Lastly, Jacques-Germain Soufflot was tasked with the modification of the portals at the front of the cathedral to allow processions to enter more easily.

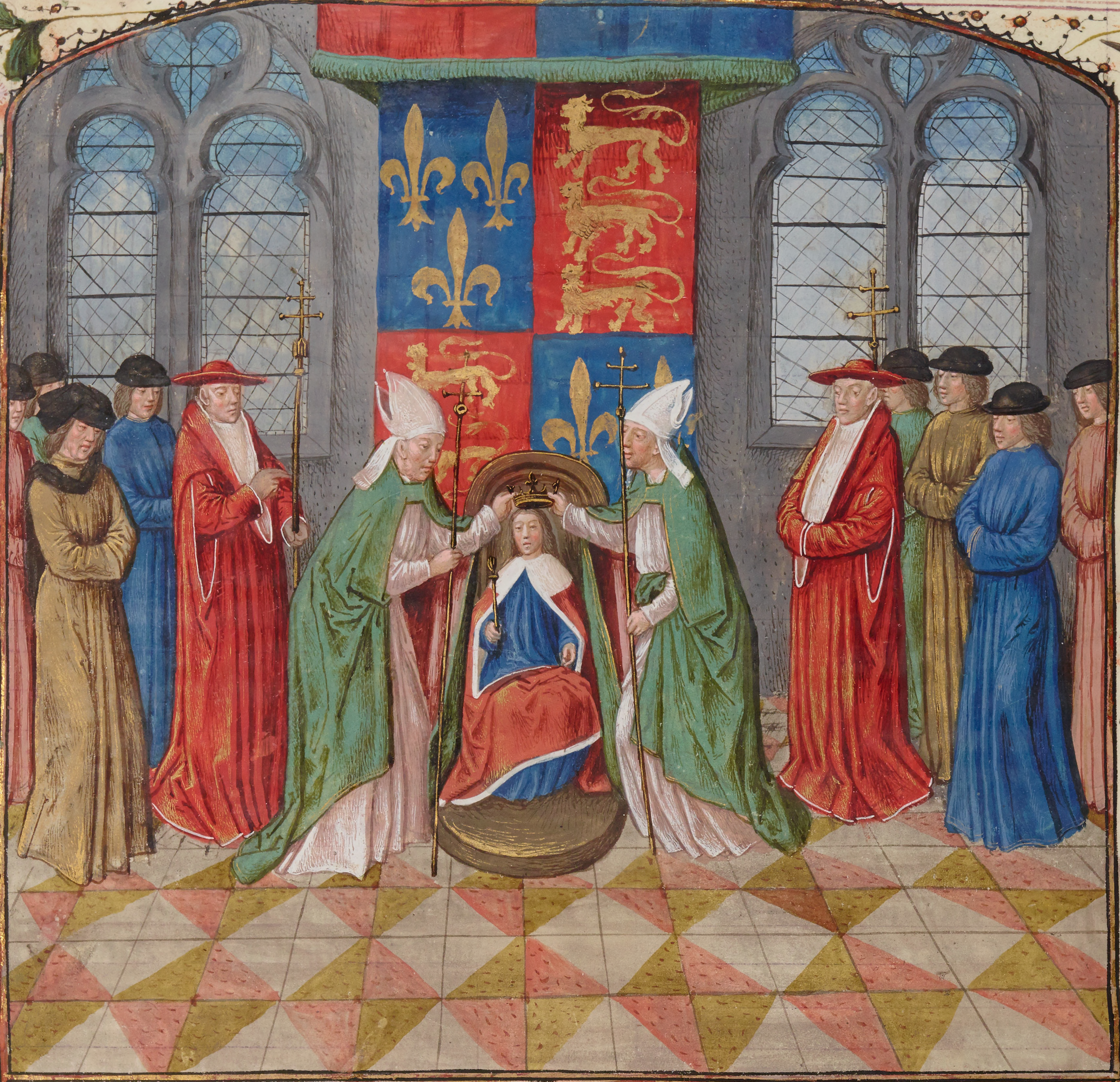
Henry VI of England's coronation in Notre-Dame as King of France, aged ten, during the Hundred Years' War. His accession to the throne was in accordance with the Treaty of Troyes of 1420.

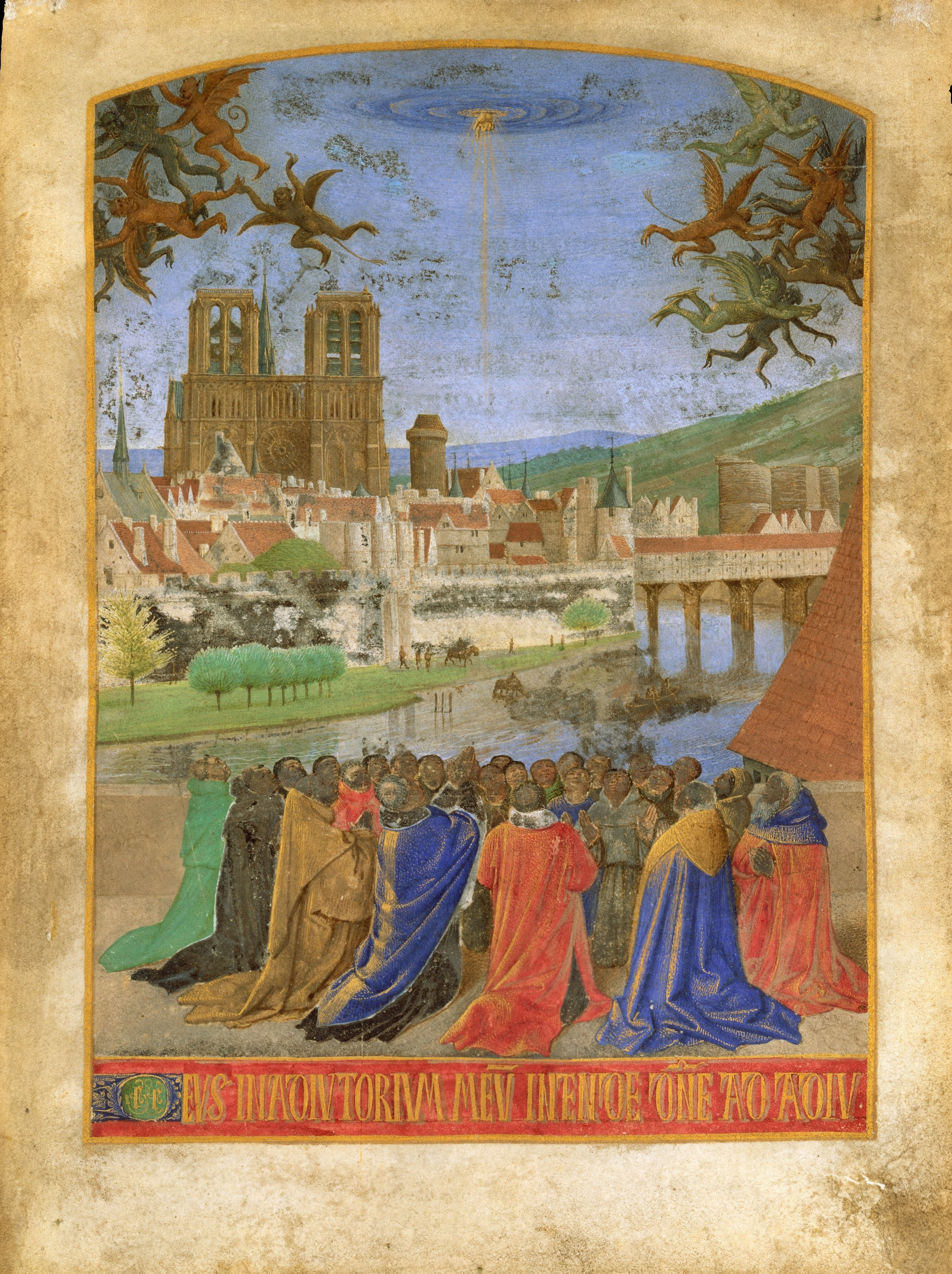
La Descente du Saint-Esprit; illustration depicting Notre-Dame from the Hours of Étienne Chevalier by Jean Fouquet, c. 1450

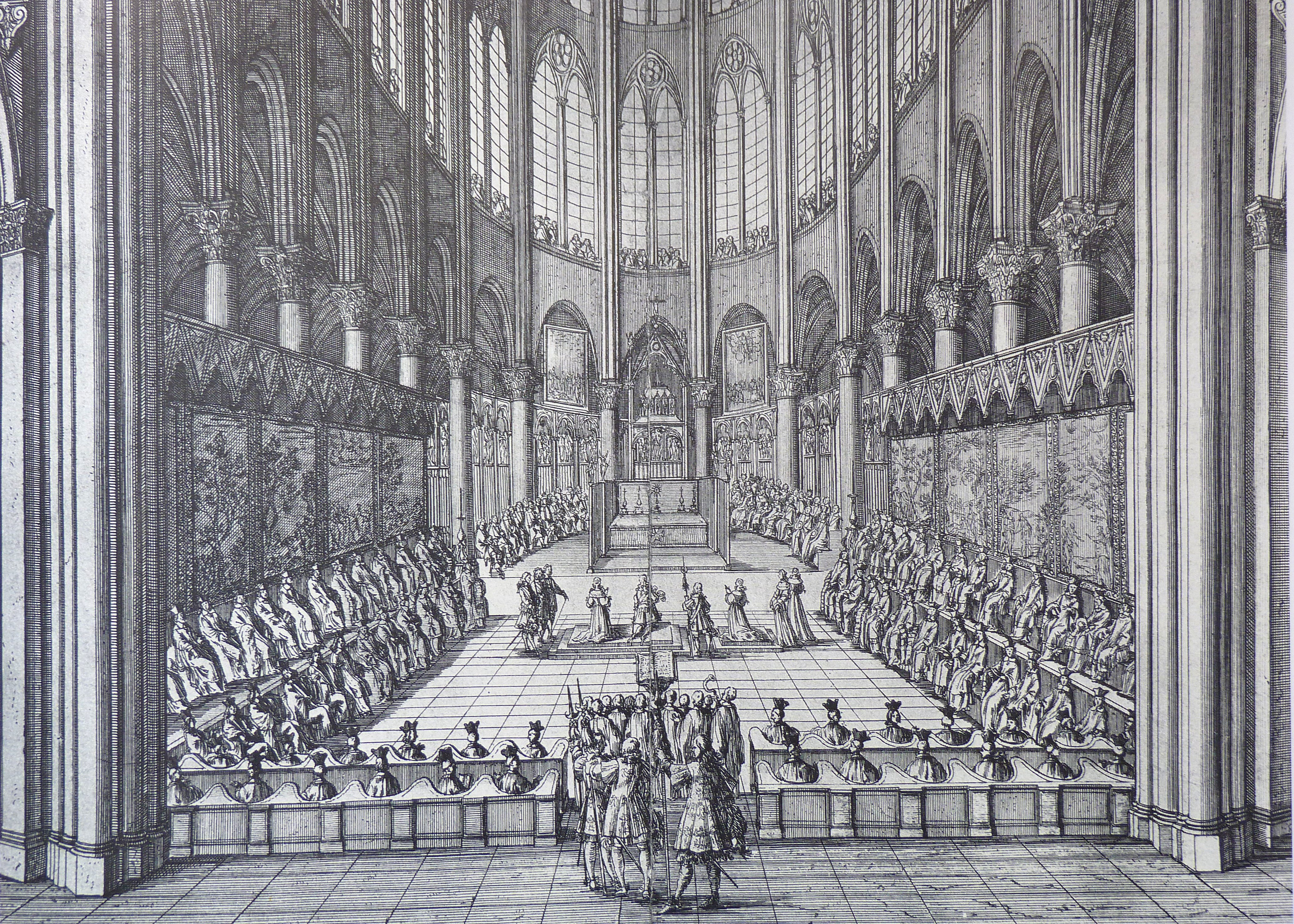
A Te Deum in the choir of Notre-Dame in 1669, during the reign of Louis XIV. The choir was redesigned to make room for more lavish ceremonies.

=== French Revolution and Napoleon ===
After the French Revolution in 1789, Notre-Dame and the rest of the church's property in France were seized and made public property. The cathedral was rededicated in 1793 to the Cult of Reason, and then to the Cult of the Supreme Being in 1794. During this time, many of the treasures of the cathedral were either destroyed or plundered. The twenty-eight statues of biblical kings located at the west façade, mistaken for statues of French kings, were beheaded. Many of the heads were found during a 1977 excavation nearby, and are on display at the Musée de Cluny. For a time the Goddess of Liberty replaced the Virgin Mary on several altars. The cathedral's great bells escaped being melted down. All of the other large statues on the façade, with the exception of the statue of the Virgin Mary on the portal of the cloister, were destroyed. The cathedral came to be used as a warehouse for the storage of food and other non-religious purposes.

With the Concordat of 1801, Napoleon Bonaparte restored Notre-Dame to the Catholic Church; this was finalised on 18 April 1802. Napoleon also named Paris's new bishop, Jean-Baptiste de Belloy, who restored the cathedral's interior. Charles Percier and Pierre-François-Léonard Fontaine made quasi-Gothic modifications to Notre-Dame for the coronation of Napoleon as Emperor of the French within the cathedral. The building's exterior was whitewashed and the interior decorated in Neoclassical style, then in vogue.

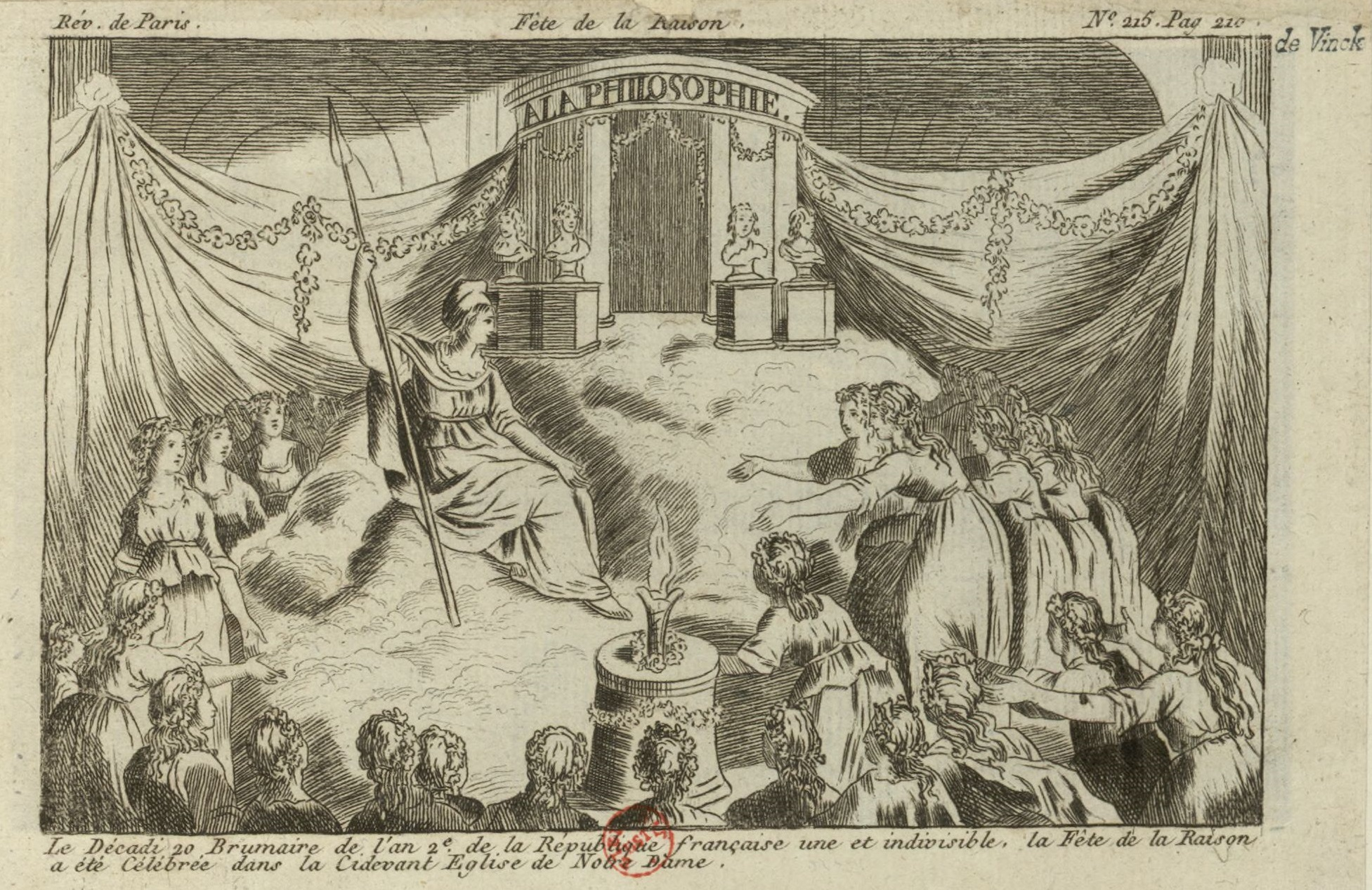
The Cult of Reason is celebrated at Notre-Dame during the French Revolution (1793)

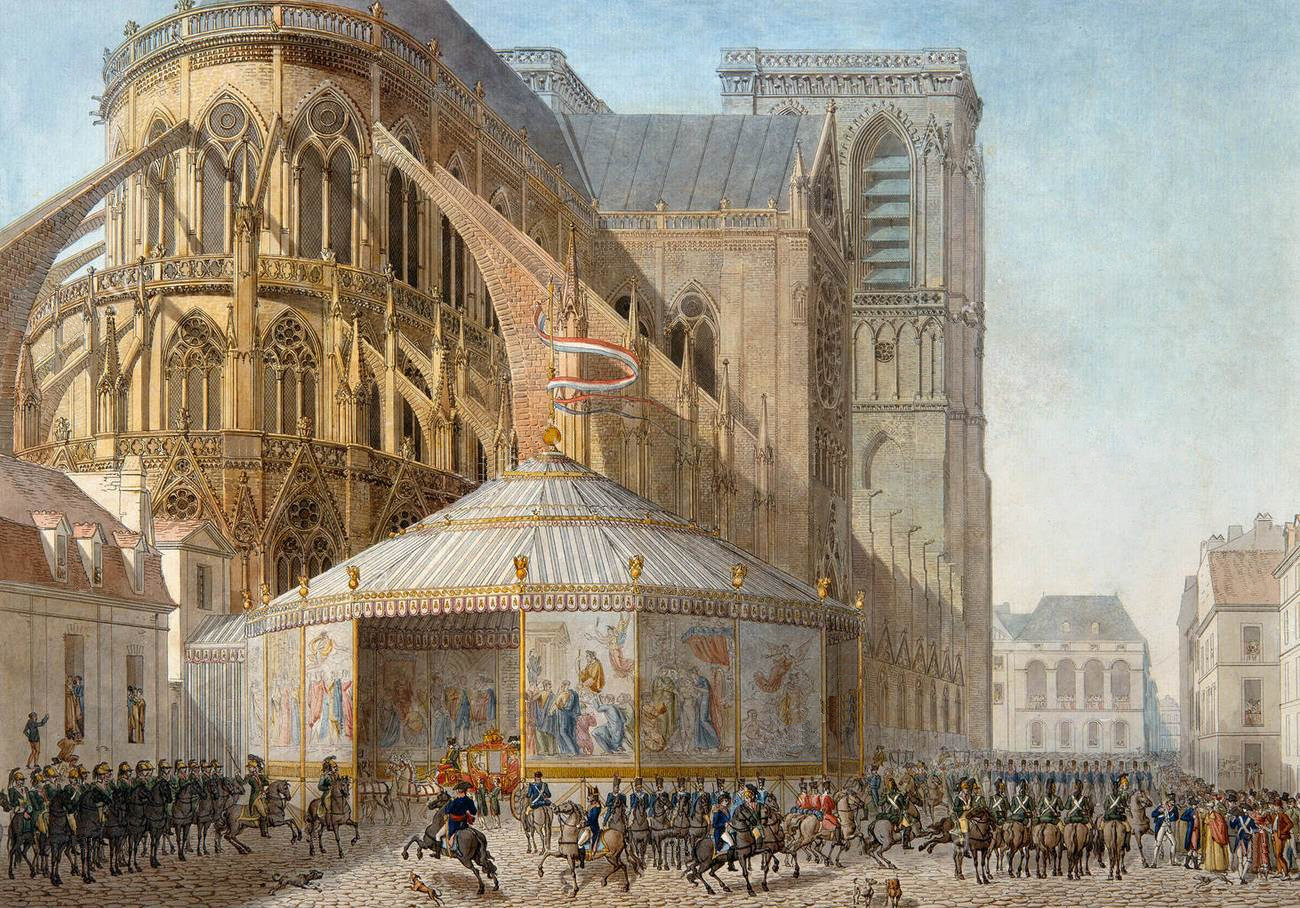
Arrival of Napoleon at the east end of Notre-Dame for his coronation as Emperor of the French on 2 December 1804

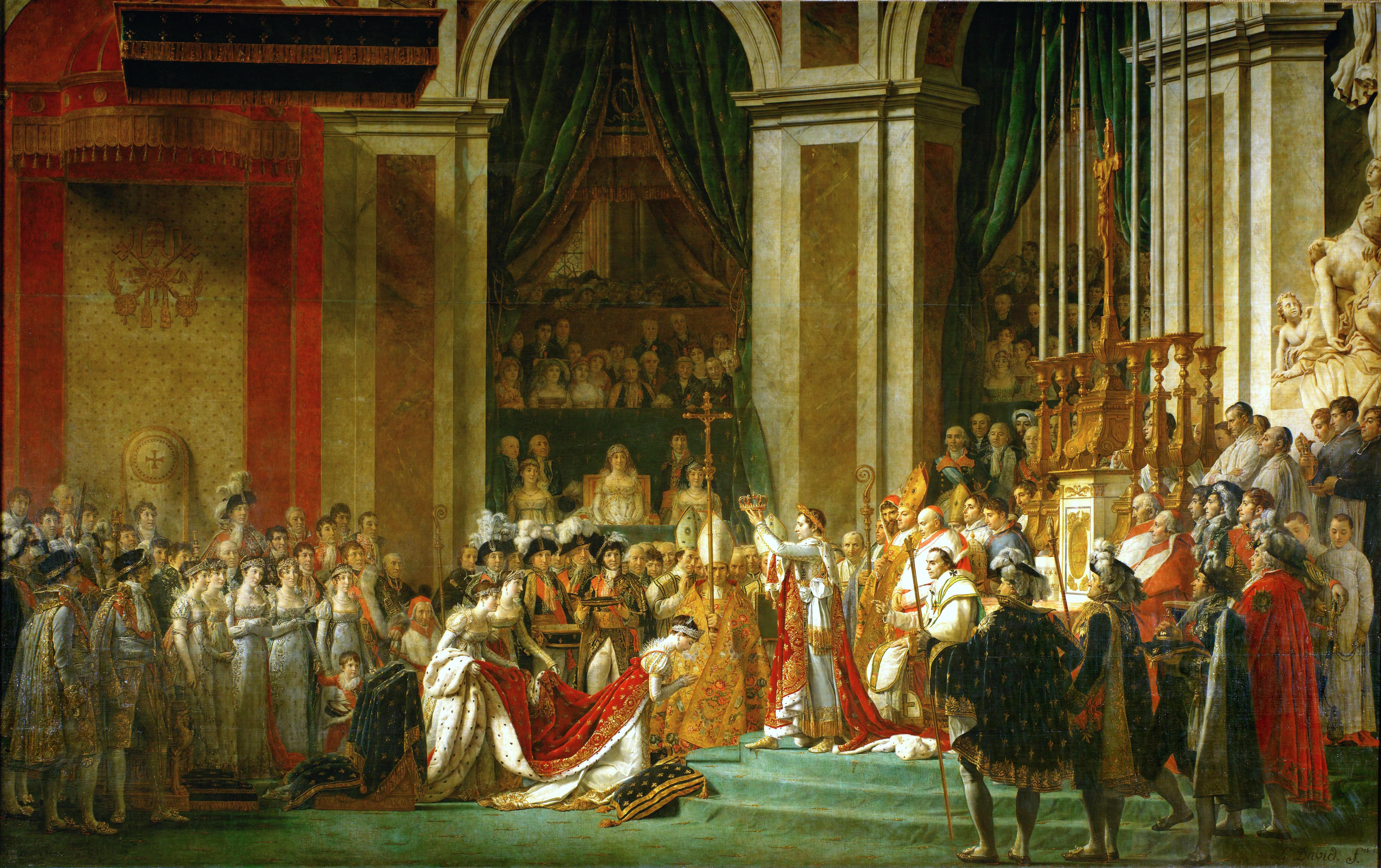
The coronation of Napoleon, on 2 December 1804 at Notre-Dame, as portrayed in the 1807 painting The Coronation of Napoleon by Jacques-Louis David

=== 19th-century restoration ===
In the decades after the Napoleonic Wars, Notre-Dame fell into such a state of disrepair that Paris officials considered its demolition. Victor Hugo, who admired the cathedral, wrote the novel Notre-Dame de Paris (published in English as The Hunchback of Notre-Dame) in 1831 to save Notre-Dame. The book was an enormous success, raising awareness of the cathedral's decaying state. The same year as Hugo's novel was published, anti-Legitimists plundered Notre-Dame's sacristy. In 1844 King Louis Philippe I ordered that the church be restored.

The architect who had been in charge of Notre-Dame's maintenance, Étienne-Hippolyte Godde, was dismissed. Jean-Baptiste Lassus and Eugène Viollet-le-Duc, who had distinguished themselves with the restoration of the nearby Sainte-Chapelle, were appointed in 1844. The next year, Viollet-le-Duc submitted a budget of 3,888,500 francs, which was reduced to 2,650,000 francs, for the restoration of Notre-Dame and the construction of a new sacristy building. This budget was exhausted in 1850, and work stopped as Viollet-le-Duc made proposals for more money. In totality, the restoration cost over 12 million francs. Supervising a large team of sculptors, glass makers and other craftsmen, and working from drawings or engravings, Viollet-le-Duc remade or added decorations if he felt they were in the spirit of the original style. One of the latter items was a taller and more ornate flèche, to replace the original 13th-century flèche, which had been removed in 1786. The decoration of the restoration included a bronze roof statue of Saint Thomas that resembles Viollet-le-Duc, as well as the sculpture of mythical creatures on the Galerie des Chimères.

The construction of the sacristy was especially financially costly. To secure a firm foundation, it was necessary for Viollet-le-Duc's labourers to dig nine metres (thirty feet). Master glassworkers meticulously copied styles of the 13th century, as written about by art historians Antoine Lusson and Adolphe Napoléon Didron.

During the Paris Commune of March through May 1871, the cathedral and other churches were closed, and some two hundred priests and the Archbishop of Paris were taken as hostages. In May, during the Semaine sanglante, or "Bloody Week", as the army recaptured the city, the Communards targeted the cathedral, along with the Tuileries Palace and other landmarks, for destruction; the Communards piled the furniture together in order to burn the cathedral. The arson was halted when the Communard government realised that the fire would also destroy the neighbouring Hôtel-Dieu hospital, filled with hundreds of patients.

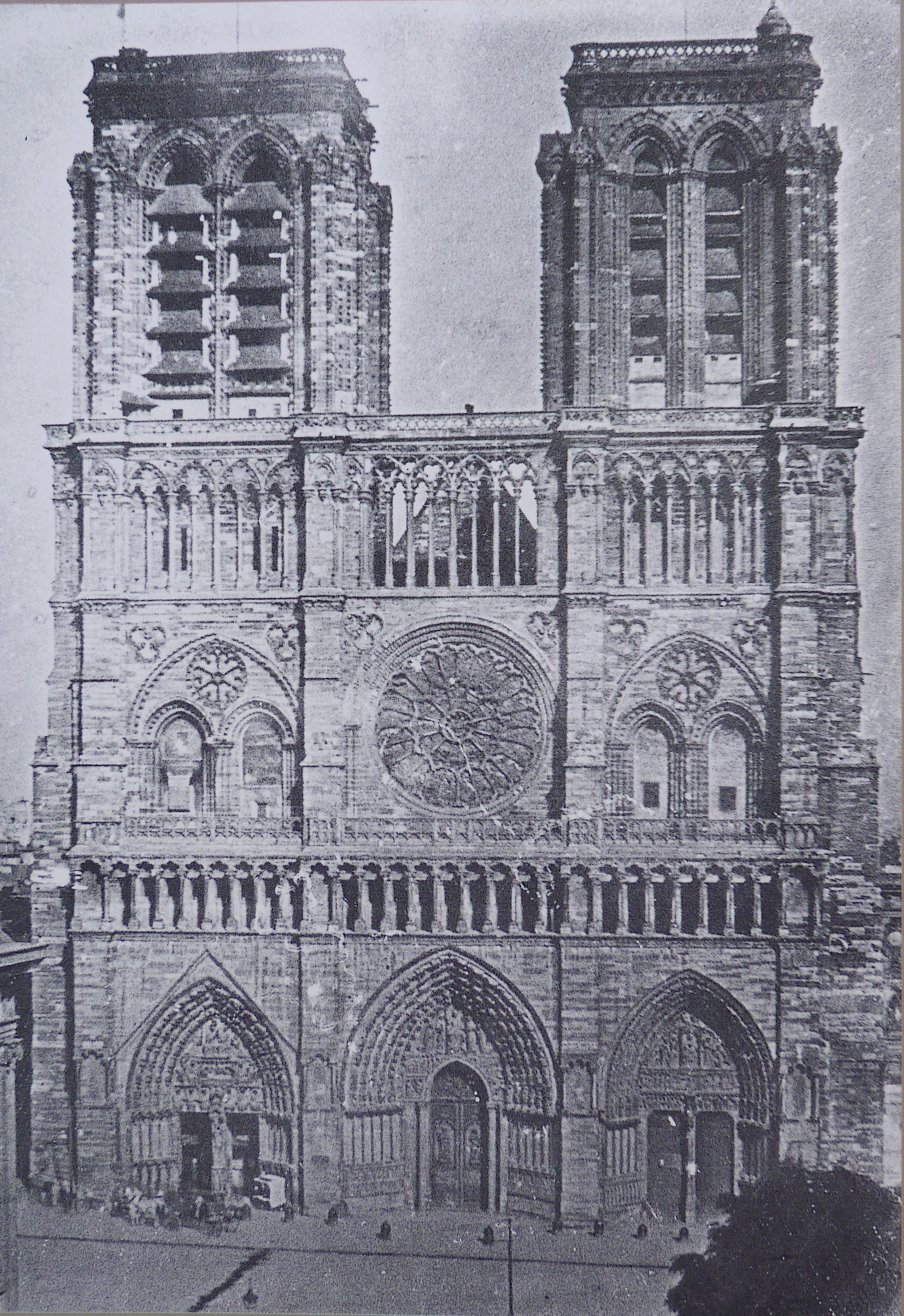
The western façade of Notre-Dame in 1841, showing the building in an advanced state of disrepair before the major restoration by Viollet-le-Duc

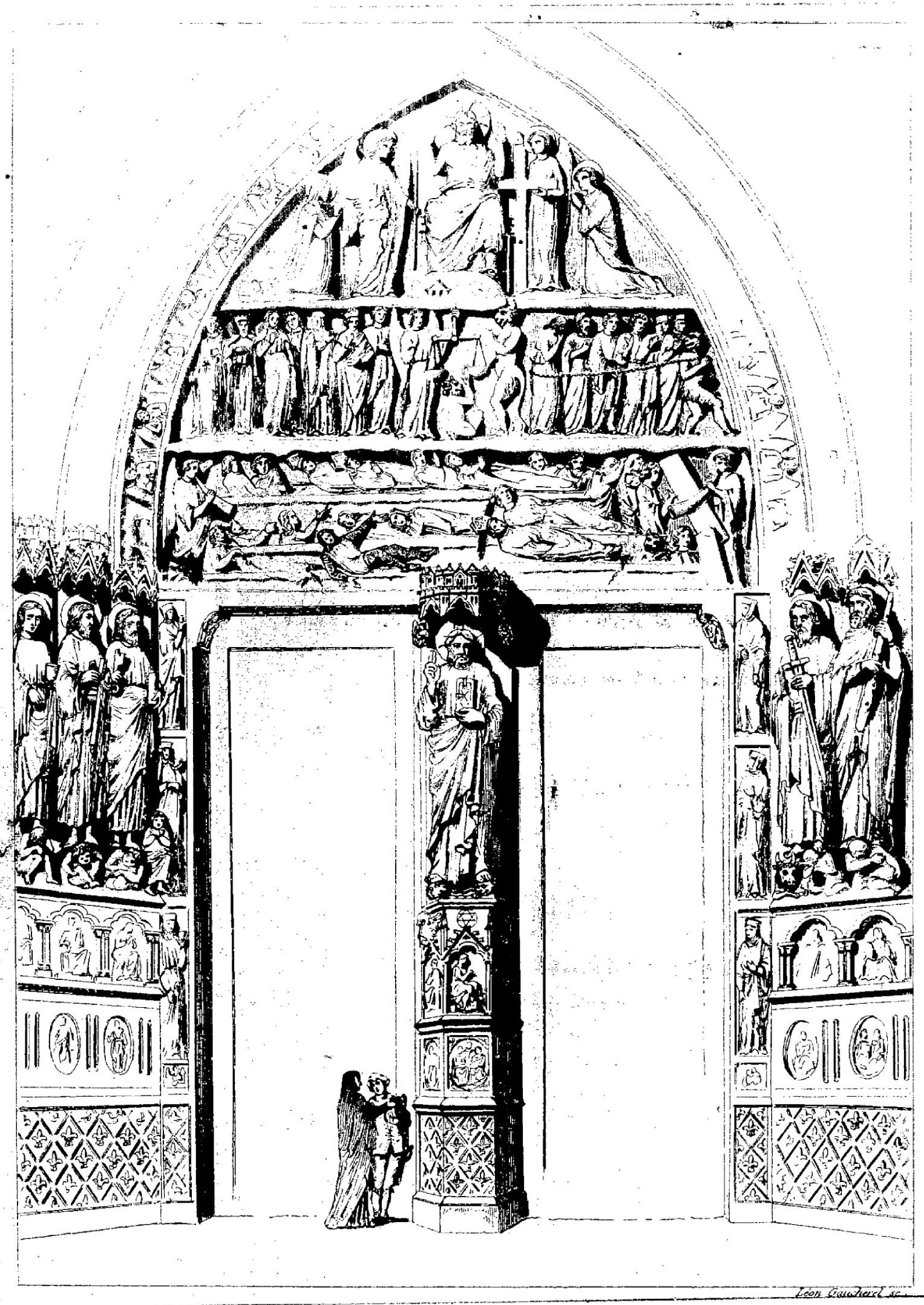
Proposed doorway decoration by Lassus and Viollet-le-Duc; plate engraved by Léon Gaucherel

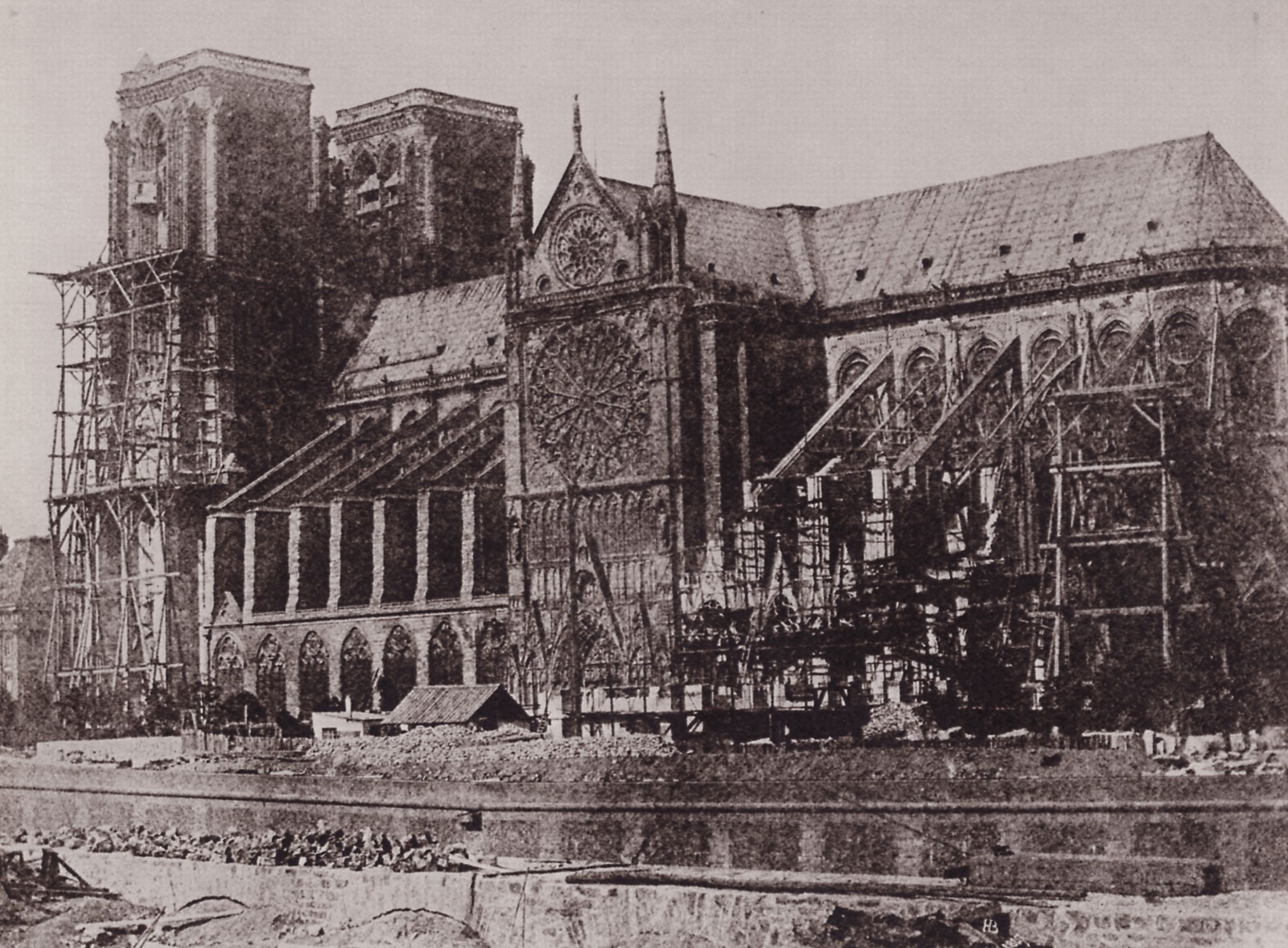
The southern façade of Notre-Dame at the beginning of the restoration work; photo from 1847 by Hippolyte Bayard

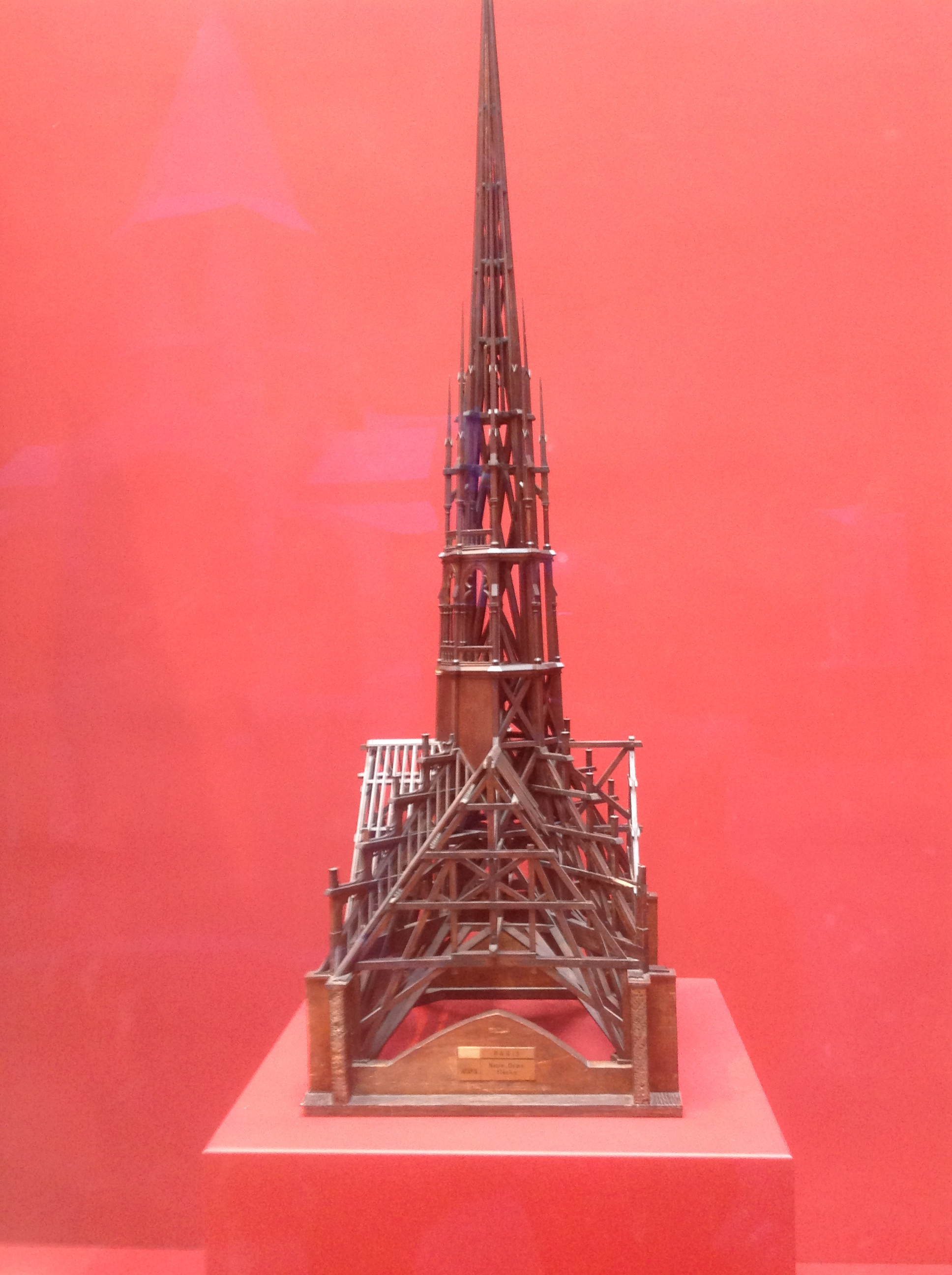
Model of the flèche and "forest" of wooden roof beams made for Viollet-le-Duc (1859) (Museum of Historic Monuments, Paris)

=== 20th century ===
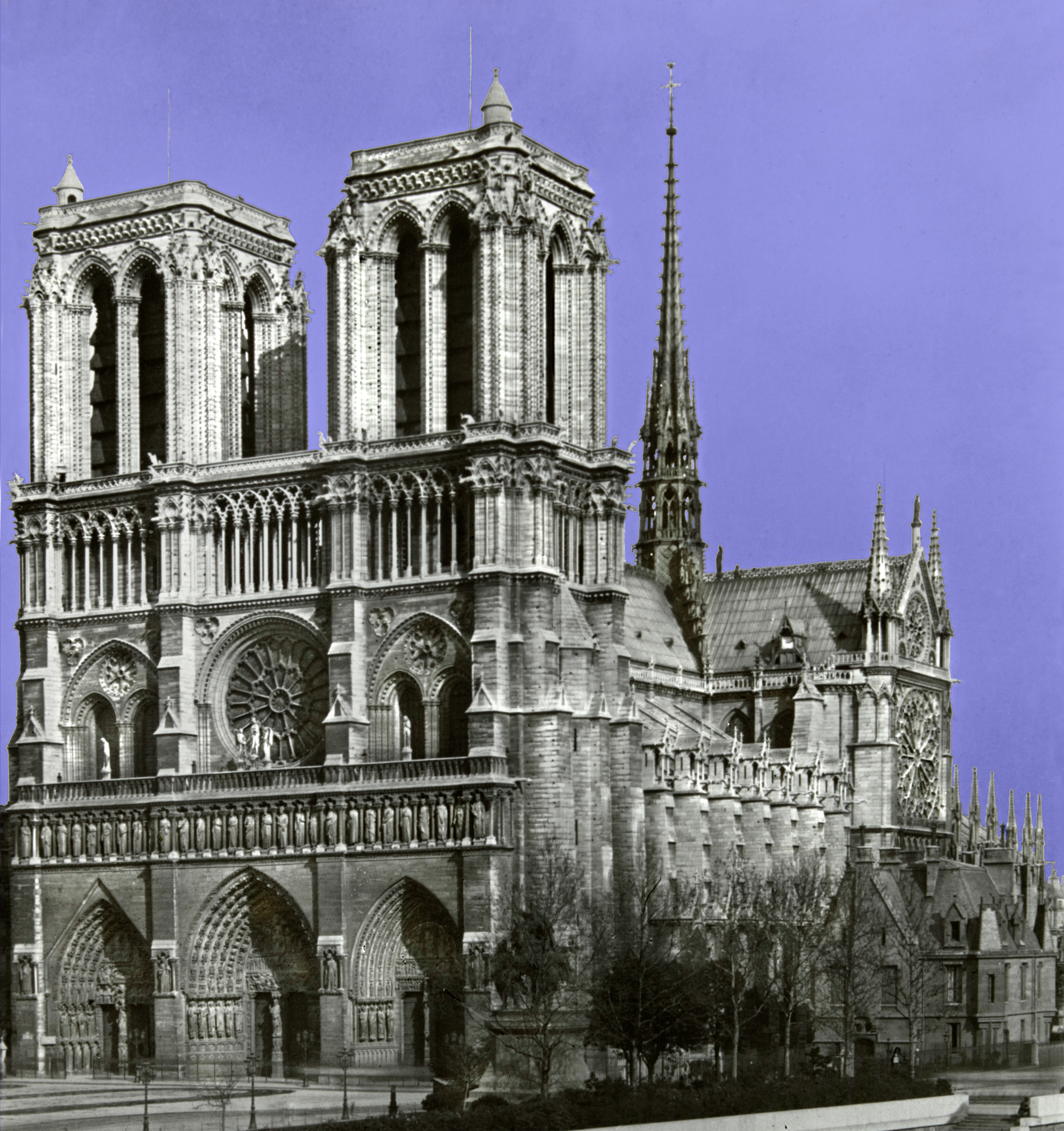
Façade of Notre-Dame in the 1930s

During the liberation of Paris in August 1944, the cathedral suffered some minor damage from stray bullets. Some of the medieval glass was damaged, and was replaced by glass with modern abstract designs. On 26 August, a special Mass was held in the cathedral to celebrate the liberation of Paris from the Germans; it was attended by General Charles De Gaulle and General Philippe Leclerc.

One of the world's first televised masses was broadcast from the cathedral on December 24, 1948, with Dominican priest Raymond Pichard organizing the television logistics.

In 1963, on the initiative of culture minister André Malraux and to mark the 800th anniversary of the cathedral, the façade was cleaned of the centuries of soot and grime, restoring it to its original off-white colour.

On 19 January 1969, vandals placed a North Vietnamese flag at the top of the flèche, and sabotaged the stairway leading to it. The flag was cut from the flèche by Paris Fire Brigade Sergeant Raymond Belle in a helicopter mission, the first of its kind in France.

The Requiem Mass of Charles de Gaulle was held in Notre-Dame on 12 November 1970. On 26 June 1971, Philippe Petit walked across a tight-rope strung between Notre-Dame's two bell towers entertaining spectators.

After the Magnificat of 30 May 1980, Pope John Paul II celebrated Mass on the parvis of the cathedral.

The Requiem Mass of François Mitterrand was held at the cathedral, as with past French heads of state, on 11 January 1996.

The stone masonry of the cathedral's exterior had deteriorated in the 19th and 20th centuries due to increased air pollution in Paris, which accelerated erosion of decorations and discoloured the stone. By the late 1980s, several gargoyles and turrets had fallen or become too loose to remain safely in place. A decade-long renovation programme began in 1991 and replaced much of the exterior, with care given to retain the authentic architectural elements of the cathedral, including rigorous inspection of new limestone blocks. A discreet system of electrical wires, not visible from below, was also installed on the roof to deter pigeons. The cathedral's pipe organ was upgraded with a computerised system to control the mechanical connections to the pipes. The west face was cleaned and restored in time for millennium celebrations in December 1999.

=== 21st century ===
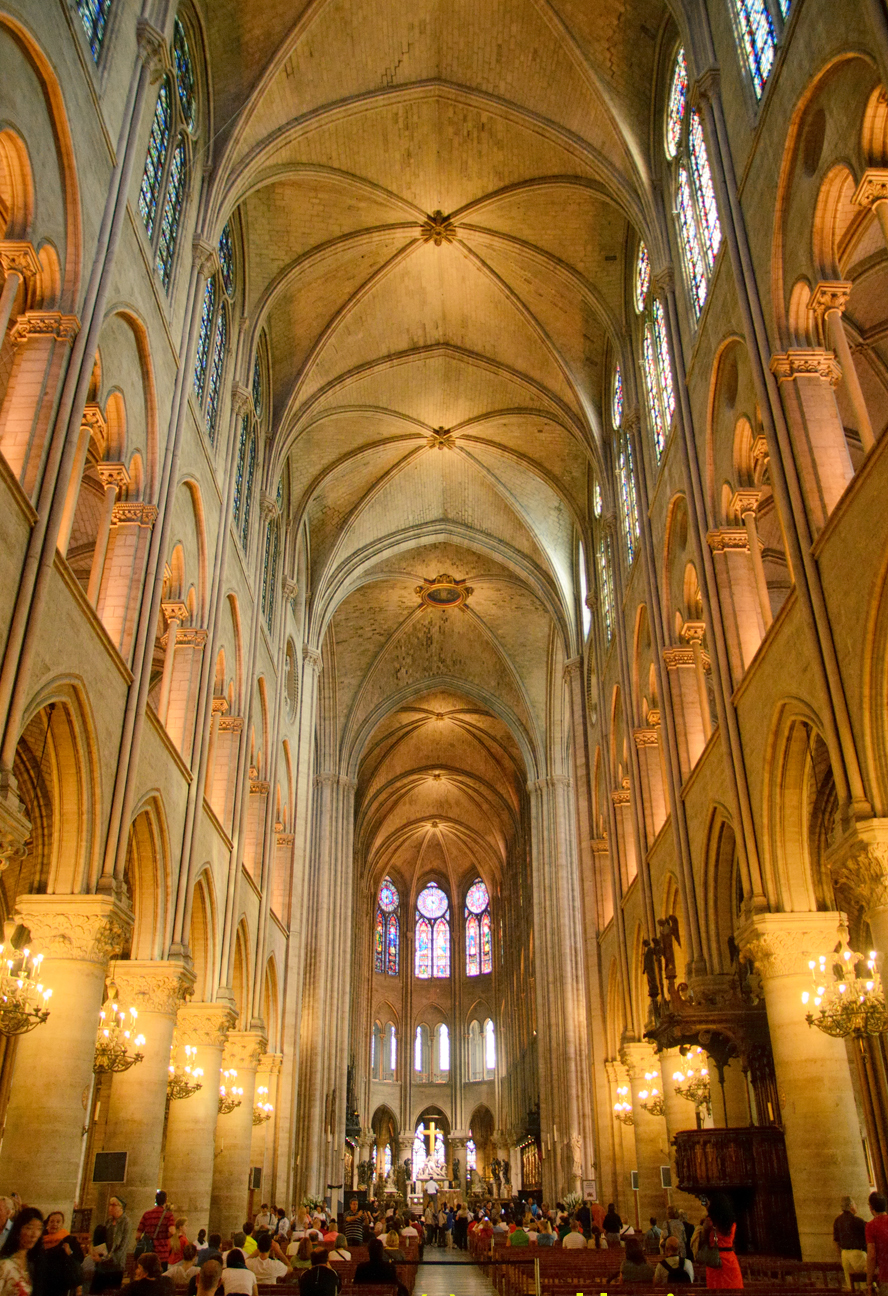
Notre-Dame in May 2012. From top to bottom, nave walls are pierced by clerestory windows, arches to triforium, and arches to side aisles.

The Requiem Mass of Cardinal Jean-Marie Lustiger, former archbishop of Paris and Jewish convert to Catholicism, was held in Notre-Dame on 10 August 2007.

The set of four 19th-century bells at the top of the northern towers at Notre-Dame were melted down and recast into new bronze bells in 2013, to celebrate the building's 850th anniversary. They were designed to recreate the sound of the cathedral's original bells from the 17th century. Despite the 1990s renovation, the cathedral had continued to show signs of deterioration that prompted the national government to propose a new renovation program in the late 2010s. The entire renovation was estimated to cost €100 million, which the archbishop of Paris planned to raise through funds from the national government and private donations. A €6 million renovation of the cathedral's flèche began in late 2018 and continued into the following year, requiring the temporary removal of copper statues on the roof and other decorative elements.

Notre-Dame began a year-long celebration of the 850th anniversary of the laying of the first building block for the cathedral on 12 December 2012. On 21 May 2013, Dominique Venner, a historian and white nationalist, placed a letter on the church altar and shot himself, dying instantly. Around 1,500 visitors were evacuated from the cathedral.

French police arrested two people on 8 September 2016 after a car containing seven gas canisters filled with diesel fuel was found near Notre-Dame.

On 10 February 2017, French police arrested four people in Montpellier known to have ties to radical Islamist organisations on charges of plotting to travel to Paris and attack the cathedral. On 6 June, visitors were shut inside Notre-Dame cathedral in Paris after a man with a hammer attacked a police officer outside.

=== 2019 fire ===
On 15 April 2019 the cathedral caught fire, destroying the flèche and the "forest" of oak roof beams supporting the lead roof. It was speculated that the fire was linked to ongoing renovation work.

The fire broke out in the attic of the cathedral at 18:18, investigators concluded. The smoke detectors immediately signalled the fire to a cathedral employee, who did not summon the fire brigade but instead sent a cathedral guard to investigate. The guard was sent to the wrong location, to the attic of the adjoining sacristy, and reported there was no fire. About 15 minutes later the error was discovered and the guard's supervisor told him to go to the correct location. The fire brigade was still not notified. By the time the guard had climbed the 300 steps to the cathedral attic, the fire was well advanced. The alarm system was not designed to automatically notify the fire brigade, which was summoned at 18:51 after the guard had returned from the attic and reported a now-raging fire, and more than half an hour after the fire alarm had begun sounding. Firefighters arrived in less than ten minutes.

The cathedral's flèche collapsed at 19:50, bringing down 750 tonnes of stone and lead. The firefighters inside were ordered down. By this time the fire had spread to the north tower, where the eight bells were. The firefighters concentrated their efforts in the tower. They feared that, if the bells fell, they could wreck the tower, and endanger the structure of the other tower and the whole cathedral. They had to ascend a stairway threatened by fire, and to contend with low water pressure for their hoses. As others watered the stairway and the roof, a team of 20 firefighters climbed the narrow stairway of the south tower, crossed to the north tower, lowered hoses to be connected to fire engines outside the cathedral, and sprayed water on the fire beneath the bells. By 21:45, they brought the fire under control.

The main structure was intact; firefighters saved the façade, towers, walls, buttresses, and stained-glass windows. The stone vaulting that forms the ceiling of the cathedral had several holes but was otherwise intact. The Great Organ, which has over 8,000 pipes and was built by François Thierry in the 18th century, was also saved but damaged by water. Because of the renovation, the copper statues on the flèche had been removed before the fire. About 500 firefighters helped to battle the fire, President Emmanuel Macron said. One firefighter was seriously injured and two police officers were hurt during the blaze.

No Christmas Mass was held in 2019 for the first time in more than 200 years. The first cathedral choir performance since the fire took place in December 2020; only eight members sang because of COVID-19 pandemic restrictions. A video of the event aired just before midnight on 24 December.

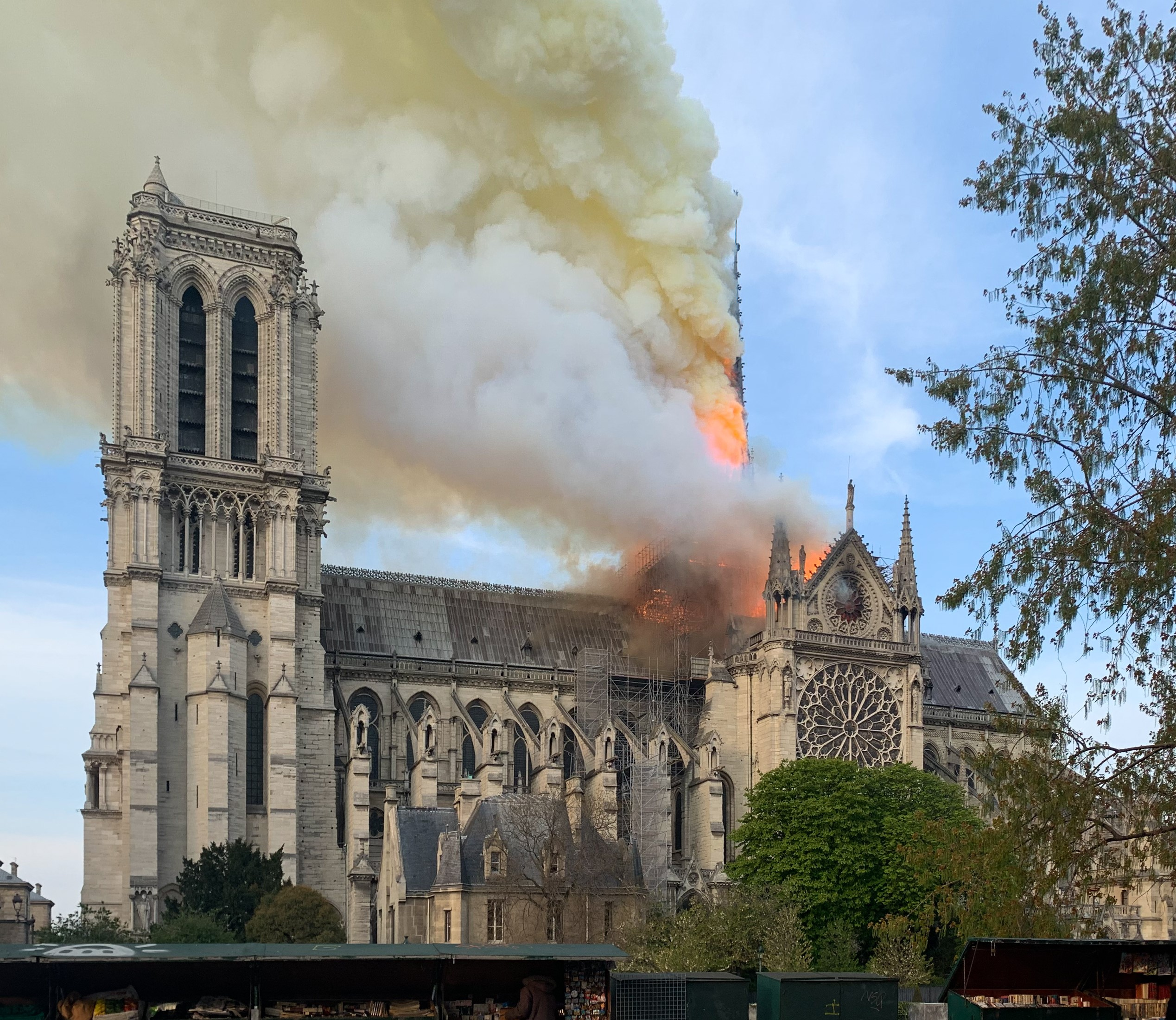
The 2019 fire destroyed Notre-Dame's wooden roof and flèche but left the outer structure largely intact.

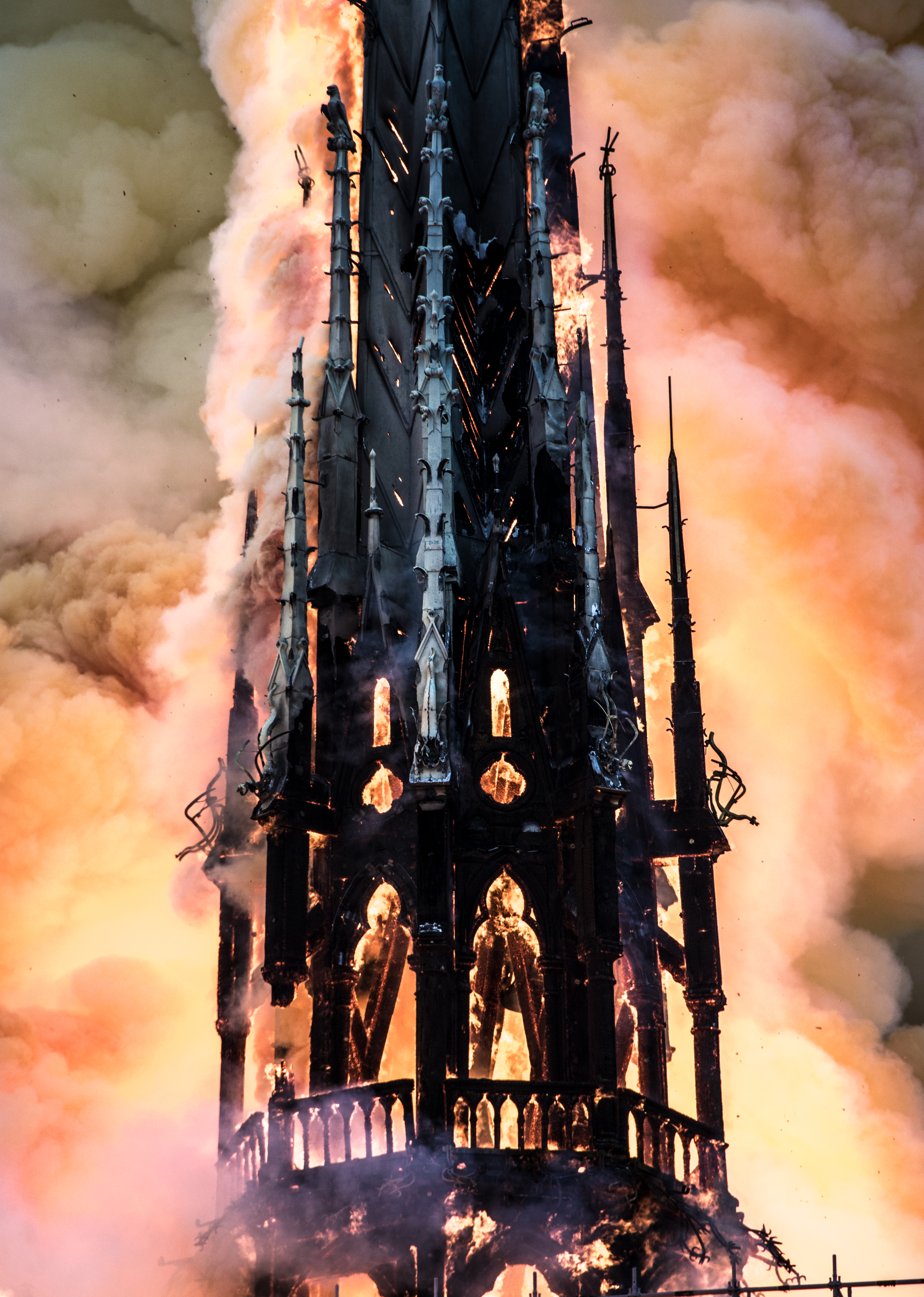
The flèche aflame during the 2019 fire, before its collapse

Animation showing the south façade before and after the fire; scaffolding had been erected as part of renovations underway when the fire started

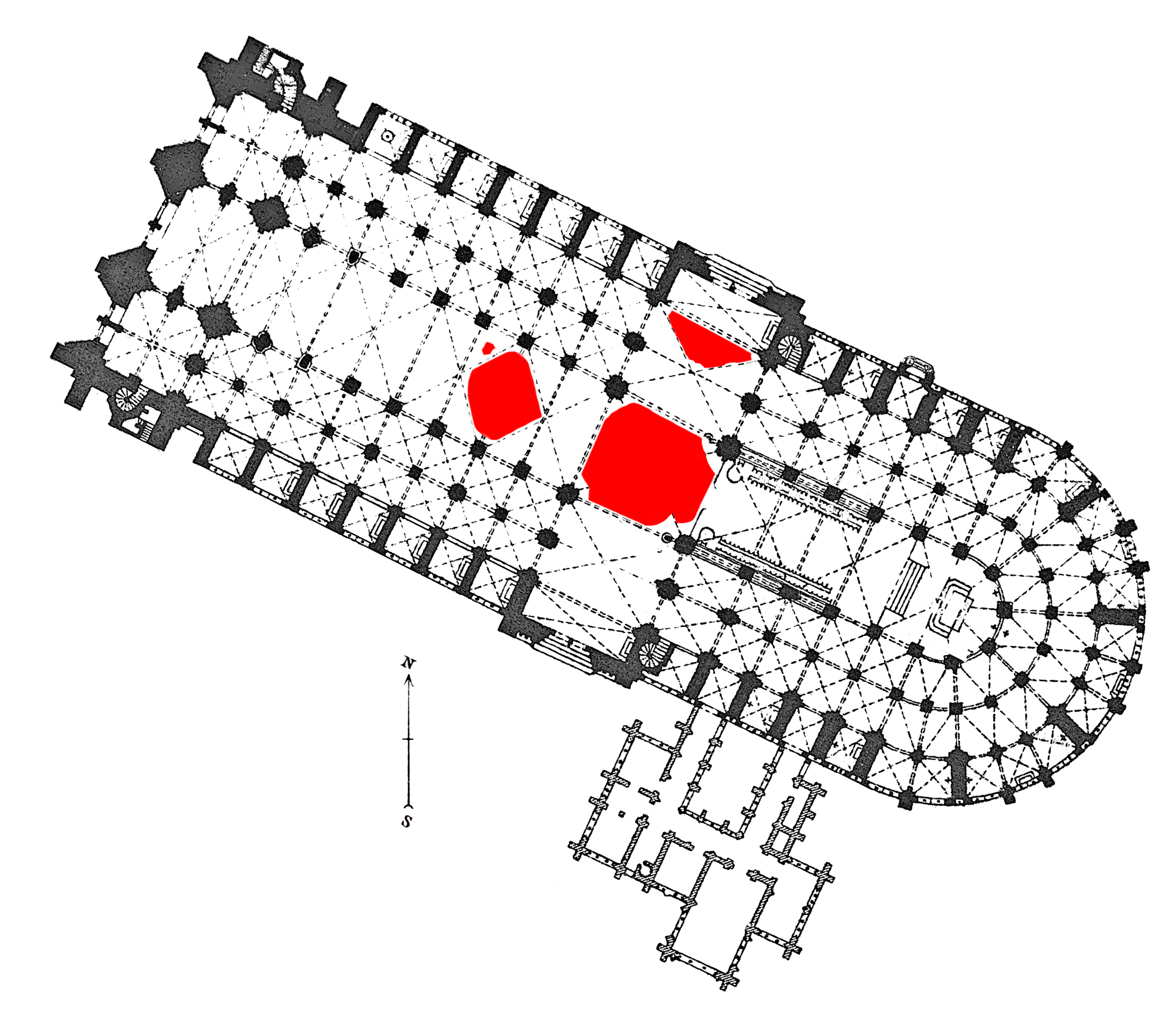
The area directly under the crossing and two other cells of vaulting collapsed

In red, the destroyed parts

==== Stabilisation of the building ====
The roof reduced to piles of char at the top of the mostly intact vaults

Immediately after the fire, Macron promised that Notre-Dame would be restored, and called for the work to be completed within five years. An international architectural competition was announced to redesign the flèche and roof. The announcement drew criticism in the international press from heritage academics and professionals who faulted the French government for being too focused on quickly building a new flèche, and neglecting to frame its response holistically as an inclusive social process encompassing the whole building and its long-term users. A new law was drafted to make Notre-Dame exempt from existing heritage laws and procedures, which prompted an open letter to Macron signed by over 1,170 heritage experts urging respect for existing regulations. The law, which passed on 11 May 2019, was hotly debated in the French National Assembly, with opponents accusing Macron's administration of using Notre-Dame for political grandstanding, and defenders arguing the need for expediency and tax breaks to encourage philanthropic giving.

Macron suggested he was open to a "contemporary architectural gesture". Even before the competition rules were announced, architects around the world offered suggestions: the proposals included a 100-metre (330 ft) flèche made of carbon fibre, covered with gold leaf; a roof built of stained glass; a greenhouse; a garden with trees, open to the sky; and a column of light pointed upwards. A poll published in the French newspaper Le Figaro on 8 May 2019 showed that 55% of French respondents wanted a flèche identical to the original. French culture minister Franck Riester promised that the restoration would not be hasty. On 29 July 2019, the French National Assembly enacted a law requiring that the restoration must "preserve the historic, artistic and architectural interest of the monument."

In October 2019, the French government announced that the first stage of reconstruction, the stabilising of the structure against collapse, would last until the end of 2020. In December 2019, Monseigneur Patrick Chauvet, the rector of the cathedral, said there was still a 50% chance that Notre-Dame could not be saved due to the risk of the remaining scaffolding falling onto the three damaged vaults. Reconstruction could not begin before early 2021. Macron announced that he hoped the reconstructed Cathedral could be finished in time for the opening of the 2024 Summer Olympics.

The first task of the restoration was the removal of 250–300 tonnes of melted metal tubes, the remains of the scaffolding, which could have fallen onto the vaults and caused further structural damage. This began in February 2020. A crane 84 metres (276 ft) high was put in place next to the cathedral to help remove the scaffolding. The work was completed in November 2020. Wooden support beams were added to stabilise the flying buttresses and other structures.

On 10 April 2020, the archbishop of Paris, Michel Aupetit, and a handful of participants, all in protective clothing to prevent exposure to lead dust, performed a Good Friday service inside the cathedral. Music was provided by the violinist Renaud Capuçon; the lectors were the actors Philippe Torreton and Judith Chemla. Chemla gave an a cappella rendition of Ave Maria.

==== Heading reconstruction ====
In February 2021, the selection of oak trees to replace the flèche and roof timbers destroyed by the fire began. A thousand mature trees were chosen from the forests of France, each of a diameter of 50 to 90 centimetres (20 to 35 in) and a height of 8 to 14 metres (26 to 46 ft), and an age of several hundred years. Once cut, the trees had to dry for 12 to 18 months. The trees were to be replaced by new plantings. Two years after the fire, a news report stated that: "there is still a hole on top of the church. They're also building a replica of the church's spire". More oak trees needed to be shipped to Paris, where they would need to be dried before use.

On 18 September 2021, the public agency overseeing the Cathedral stated that the safety work was completed, the cathedral was fully secured, and that reconstruction would begin within a few months.

==== Research ====
In 2022, a preventive dig carried out between February and April before the construction of a scaffold for reconstructing the cathedral's flèche unearthed several statues and tombs under the cathedral. One of the discoveries was a 14th-century lead sarcophagus found 20 m (65 ft) below where the transept crosses the church's 12th-century nave. On 14 April 2022, France's National Preventive Archaeological Research Institute (Inrap) announced that the sarcophagus was extracted from the cathedral and that scientists had examined the casket using an endoscopic camera, revealing the upper part of a skeleton. An opening was discovered below the cathedral floor, likely made around 1230 when the Gothic cathedral was first under construction; inside were fragments of a choir screen dating from the 13th century that had been destroyed in the early 18th century. In March 2023, archaeologists uncovered thousands of metal staples in various parts of the cathedral, some dating back to the early 1160s. The archaeologists concluded that "Notre Dame is now unquestionably the first known Gothic cathedral where iron was massively used to bind stones as a proper construction material."

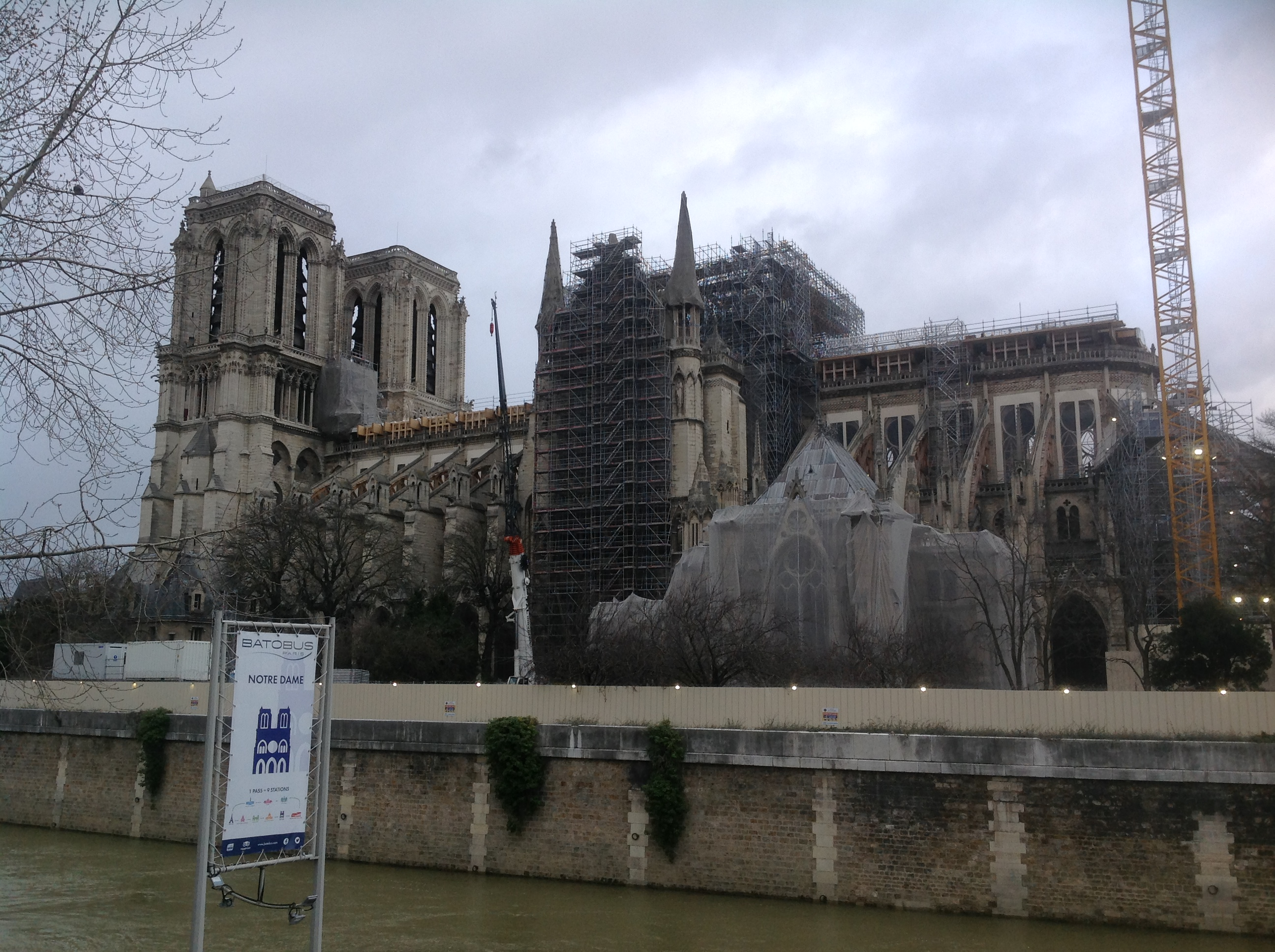
Ongoing stabilization of Notre-Dame in February 2020

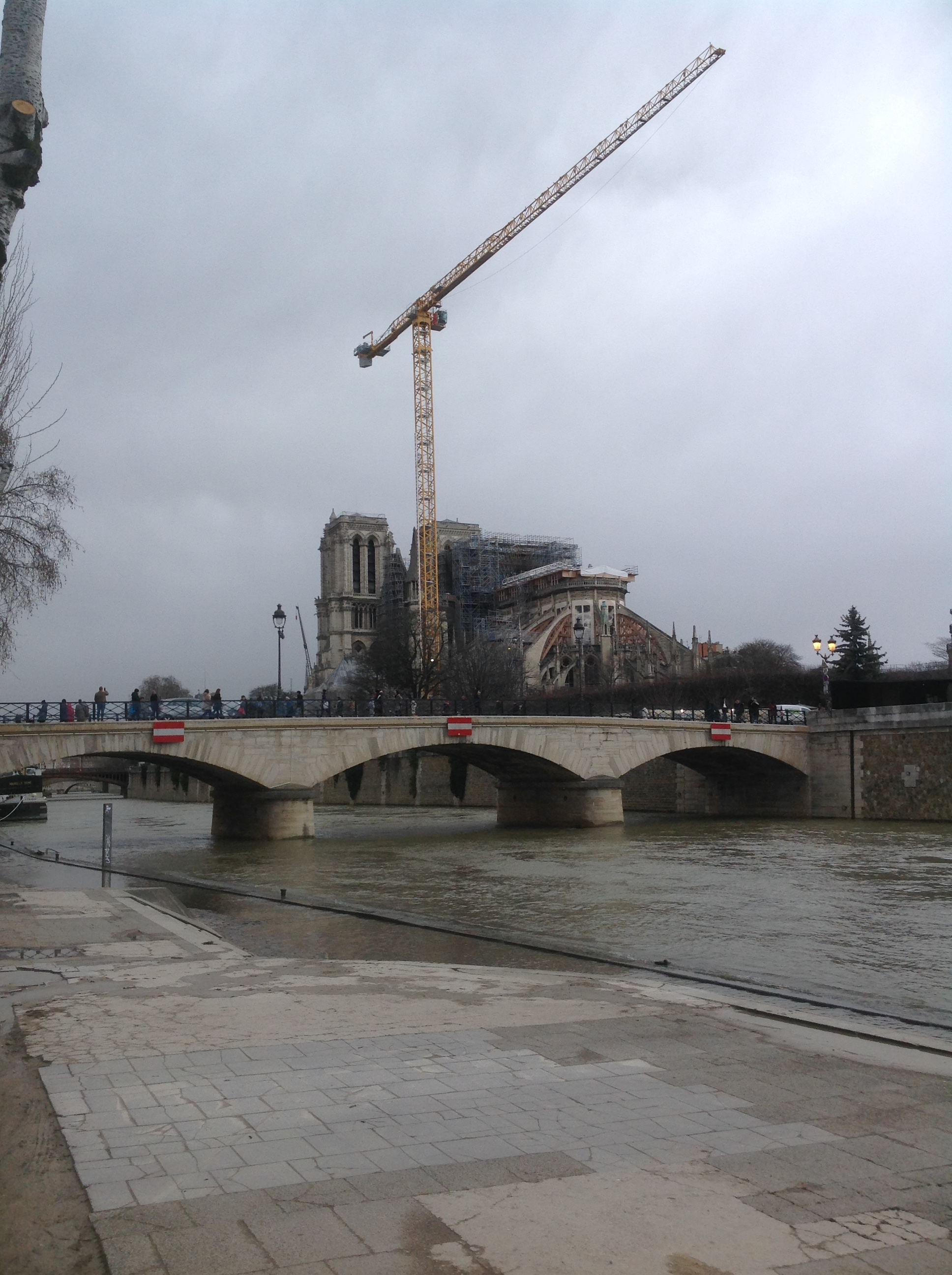
Stabilization of Notre-Dame and removal of roof debris and scaffolding in February 2020

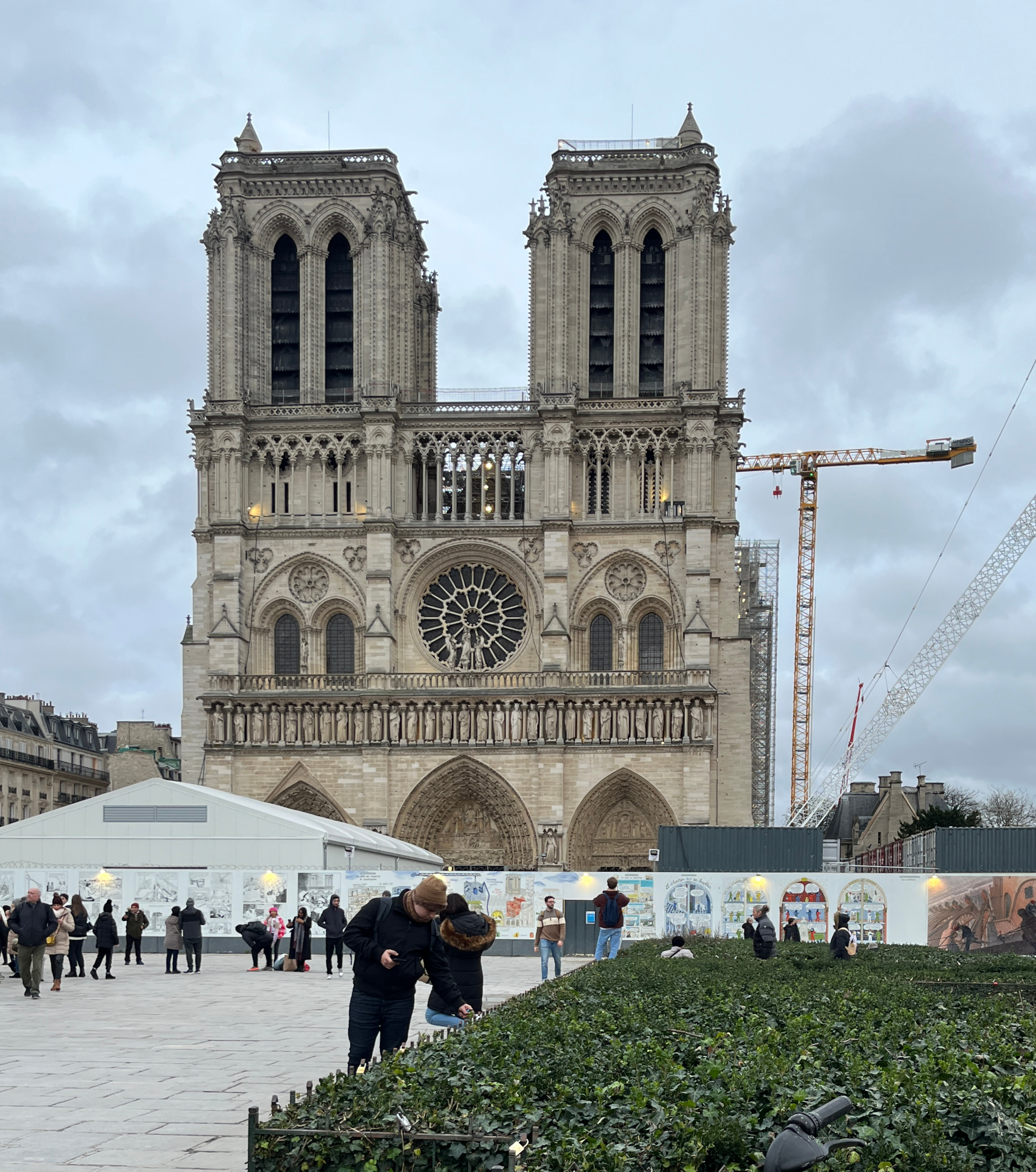
Front view of Notre-Dame in January 2023

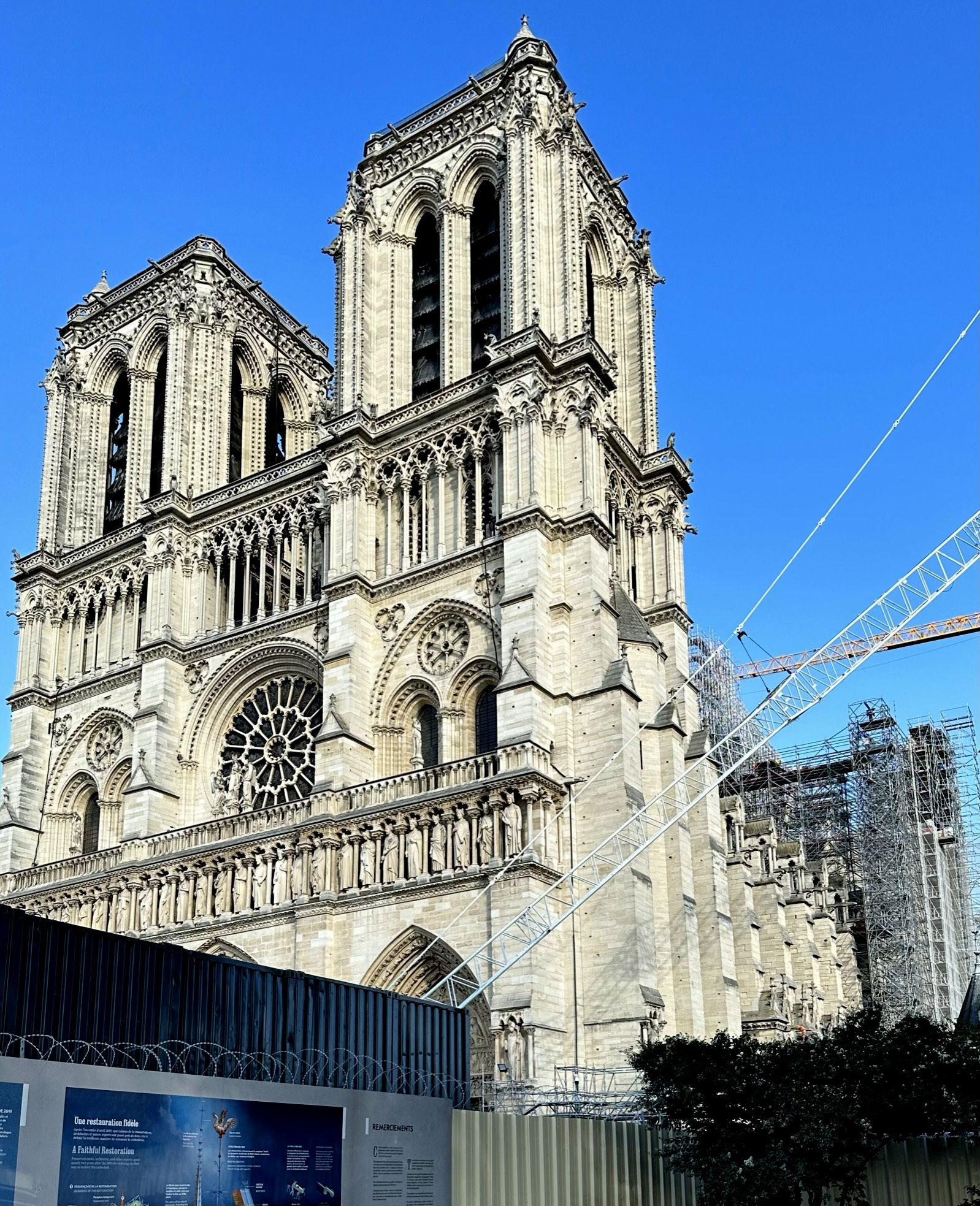
Southwest corner of Notre-Dame in September 2023

==== Reopening ====
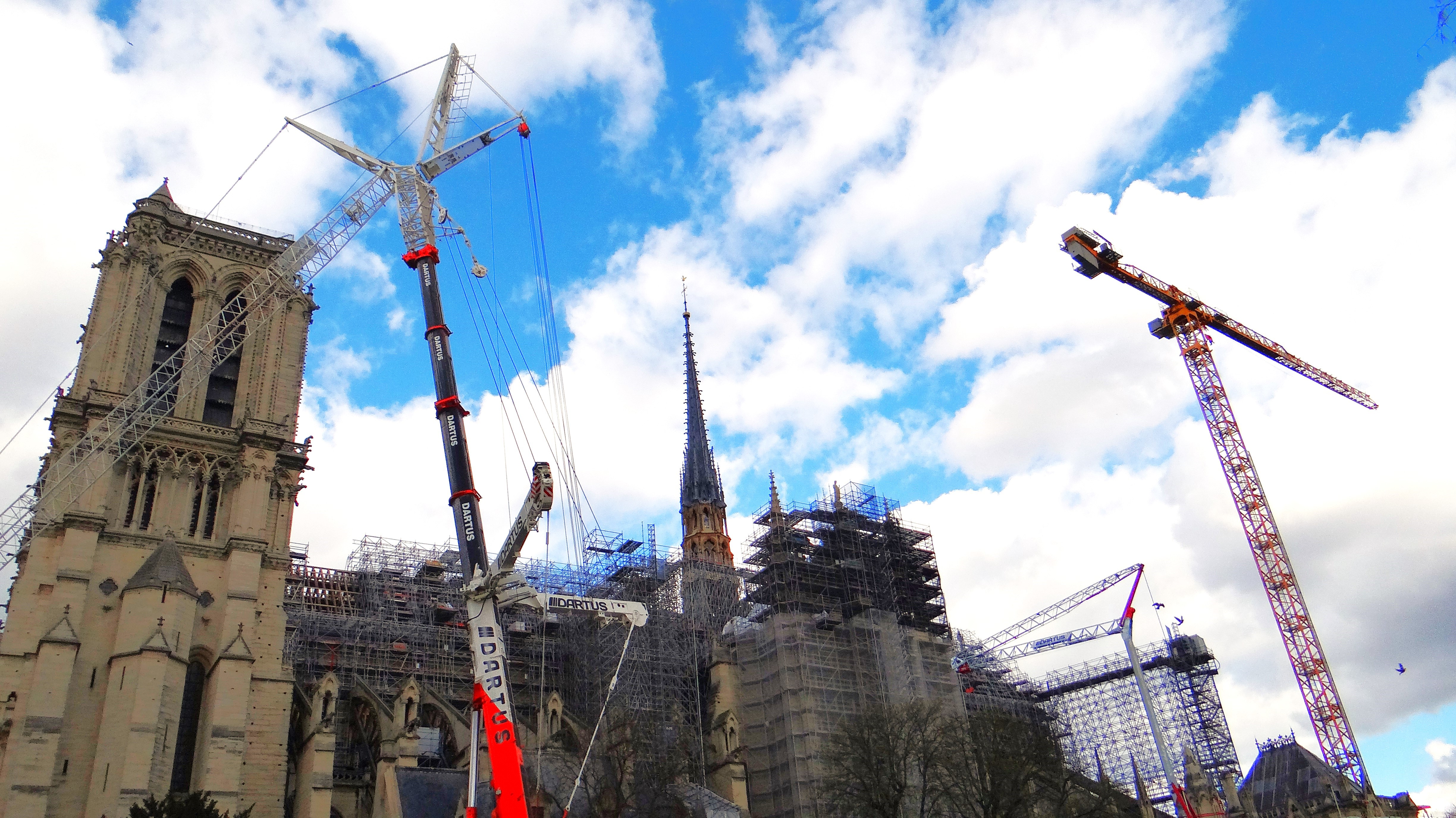
Reconstruction as of 2024

The cathedral reopened on 7 December 2024 in a ceremony presided over by Laurent Ulrich, the Archbishop of Paris, and attended by 1,500 world leaders and dignitaries such as US President-elect Donald Trump, US first lady Jill Biden, Britain's Prince William, and Ukrainian president Volodymyr Zelenskyy. Pope Francis declined an invitation from Macron to attend the reopening, holding a consistory in Rome to create 21 new cardinals on that day and planning a visit to the French island of Corsica the following week.

Interior view of Notre-Dame after restoration work

=== Colour and controversy ===
The colour of the restored interior would be "a shock" to some returning visitors, according to General Jean-Louis Georgelin, the French army officer heading the restoration. "The whiteness under the dirt was quite spectacular". The stone was sprayed with a latex solution to remove accumulated grime and soot. The cleaning of the church interior with latex solutions was criticised by Michael Daley of Artwatch UK, referring to the earlier cleaning of St Paul's Cathedral in London. He asked, "Is there any good basis for wishing to present an artificially brightened and ahistorical white interior?" Jean-Michel Guilemont of the French Ministry of culture responded, "The interior elevations will regain their original colour, since the chapels and side aisles were very dirty. Of course it is not a white colour. The stone has a blonde colour, and the architects are very attentive to obtaining a patina which respects the centuries".

=== New window controversy ===
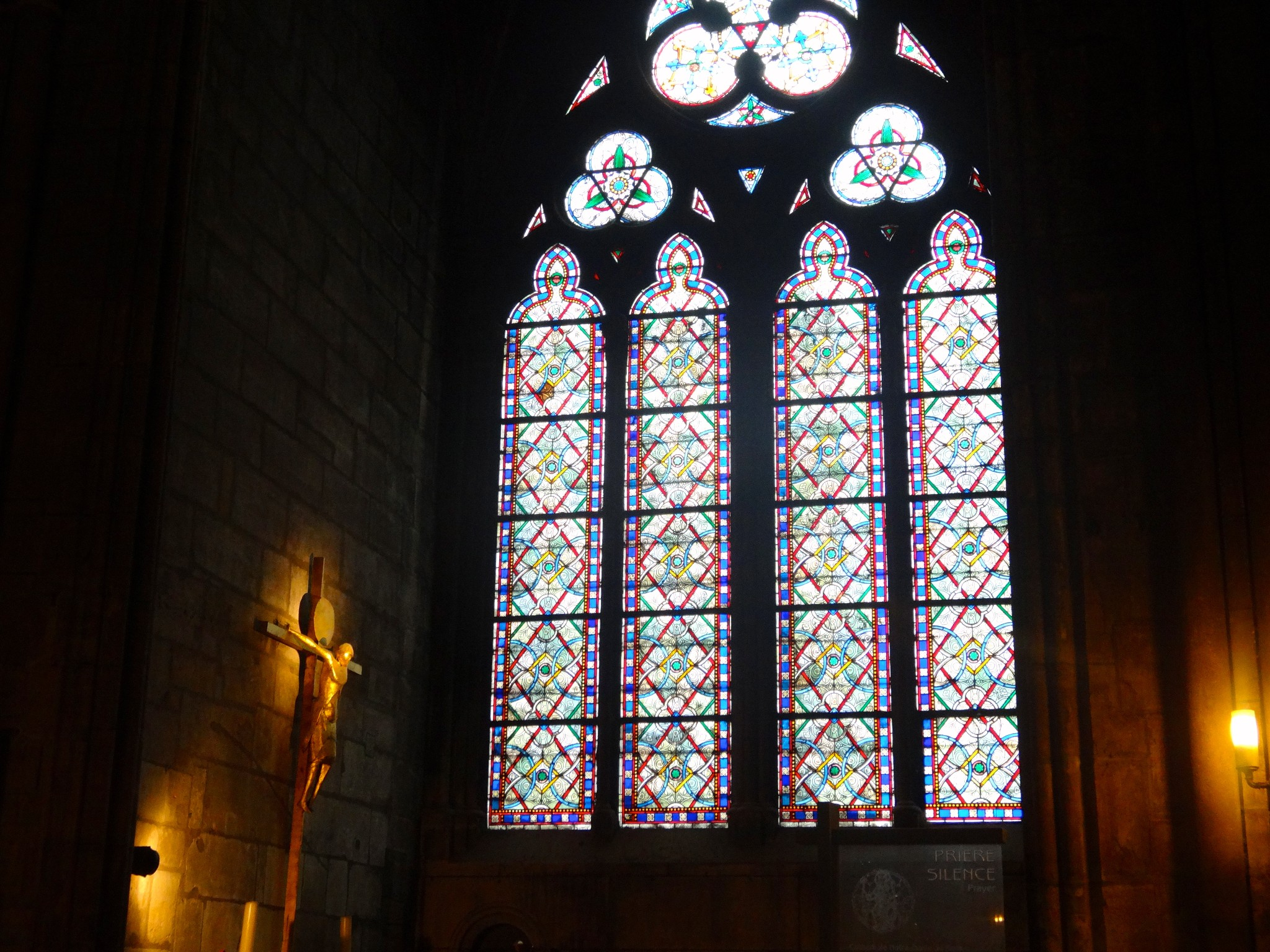
St. Eloi Chapel window proposed for replacement by a modernist window

In 2023 Emmanuel Macron announced a competition sponsored by the French government to replace stained-glass windows, and the creation of a museum dedicated to Notre-Dame within the Hôtel-Dieu.

A new controversy arose in late 2024 over a proposal by French president Macron and the archbishop Laurent Ulrich to replace six stained-glass windows installed in chapels in the 19th century by Viollet-le-Duc and undamaged by the fire, whose value is considered more historical than aesthetic, with six modernist windows designed by contemporary artist Claire Tabouret, who had won the competition for new window designs. Her proposed windows are described as inclusive and representative of the modern world, intending to realistically depict people from different cultures and backgrounds praying together. The proposed windows are strongly opposed by preservationists, who want the cathedral to be restored exactly as it was before the fire. They were being made as of 2026.

== Towers and the flèche ==
The two towers are 69 metres (226 ft) high. The towers were the last major element of the cathedral to be constructed. The south tower was built first, between 1220 and 1240, and the north tower between 1235 and 1250. The newer north tower is slightly larger, as can be seen when they are viewed from directly in front of the church. The contrefort or buttress of the north tower is also larger. The cathedral's main peal of bells is within these towers.

The south tower is accessible to visitors by a stairway, whose entrance is on the south side of the tower. The stairway has 387 steps, and has a stop at the Gothic hall at the level of the rose window, where visitors could look over the parvis and see a collection of paintings and sculpture from earlier periods of the cathedral's history.

The cathedral's flèche (or spirelet) was located over the transept. The original flèche was constructed in the 13th century, probably between 1220 and 1230. It was battered, weakened and bent by the wind over five centuries, and was removed in 1786. During the 19th-century restoration, Viollet-le-Duc recreated it, making a new version of oak covered with lead. The entire flèche weighed 750 tonnes.

The cockerel weathervane on top of the flèche has both a religious and political symbolism. The cockerel is the symbol of the French state, which since 1905 has owned Notre-Dame and the other 86 cathedrals in France. It is found over all French cathedrals, as well as over the entrance of the Elysée Palace, the residence of the French president, on other government buildings, and on French postage stamps.

Following Viollet-le-Duc's plans, the flèche was surrounded by copper statues of the Twelve Apostles‍—‌a group of three at each point of the compass. In front of each group is a symbol representing one of the four evangelists: a winged ox for Saint Luke, a lion for Saint Mark, an eagle for Saint John and an angel for Saint Matthew. Just days prior to the fire, the statues were removed for restoration. While in place, they had faced outwards towards Paris, except one: the statue of Saint Thomas, the patron saint of architects, faced the flèche, and had the features of Viollet-le-Duc.

The cockerel weathervane at the top of the flèche contained three relics: a tiny piece from the Crown of Thorns in the cathedral treasury, and relics of Saint Denis and Saint Genevieve, patron saints of Paris. They were placed there in 1935 by Archbishop Jean Verdier, to protect the congregation from lightning or other harm. The cockerel was recovered in the rubble shortly after the fire, and has since been on display inside the reopened cathedral.

The new flèche was put in place on 16 December 2023, and a new gilded cockerel sculpture, designed by architect Philippe Villeneuve, was also installed, containing the same relics as old flèche, as well as the names of two thousand people who had participated in the reconstruction. Getting to work, Villeneuve's team scrutinised the journal in which Viollet-le-Duc had entered all the details of Notre-Dame's 19th century restoration work.

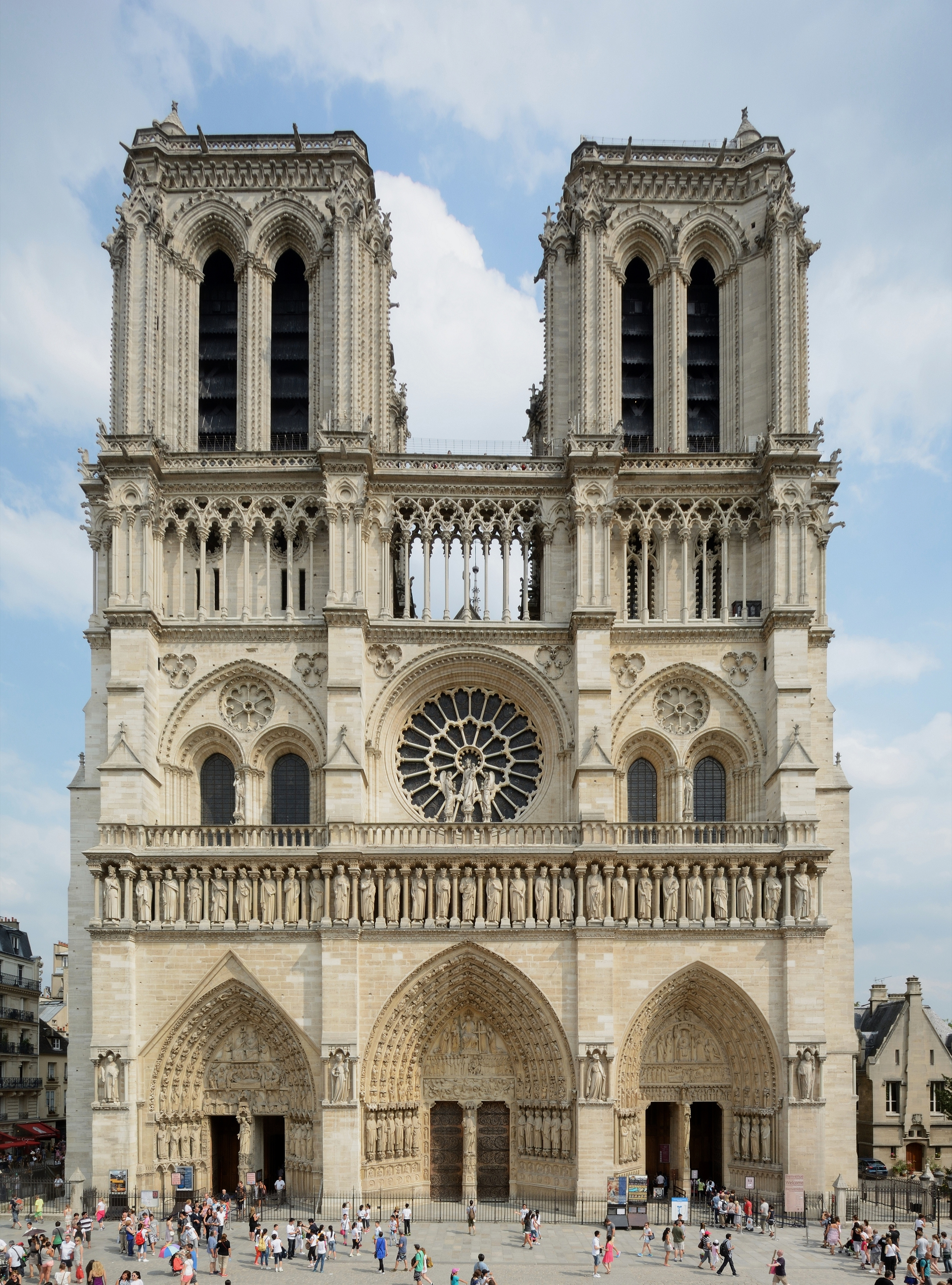
Towers on west façade (1220–1250)

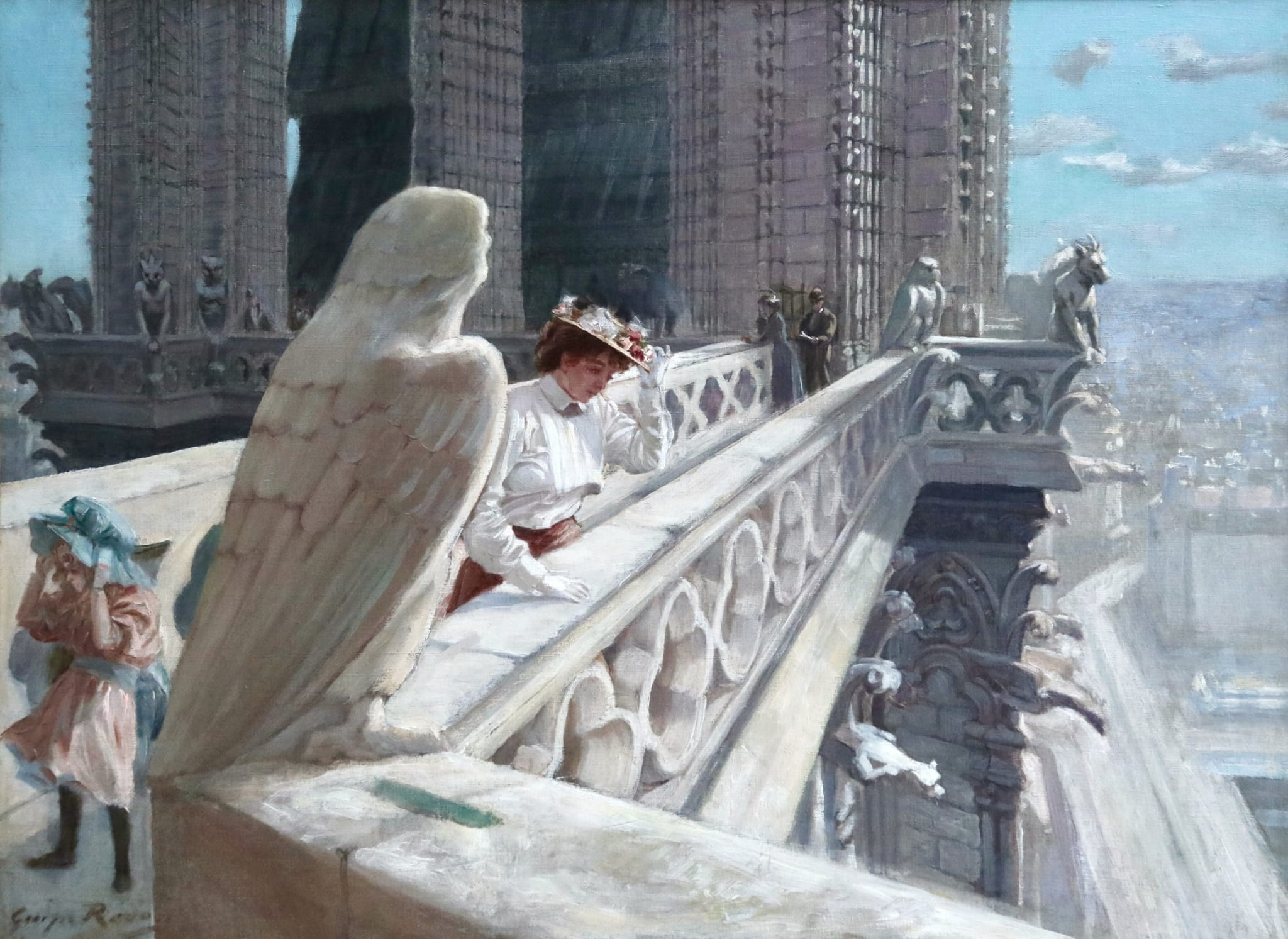
The gallery of chimeras pictured in 1910 by Georges Redon

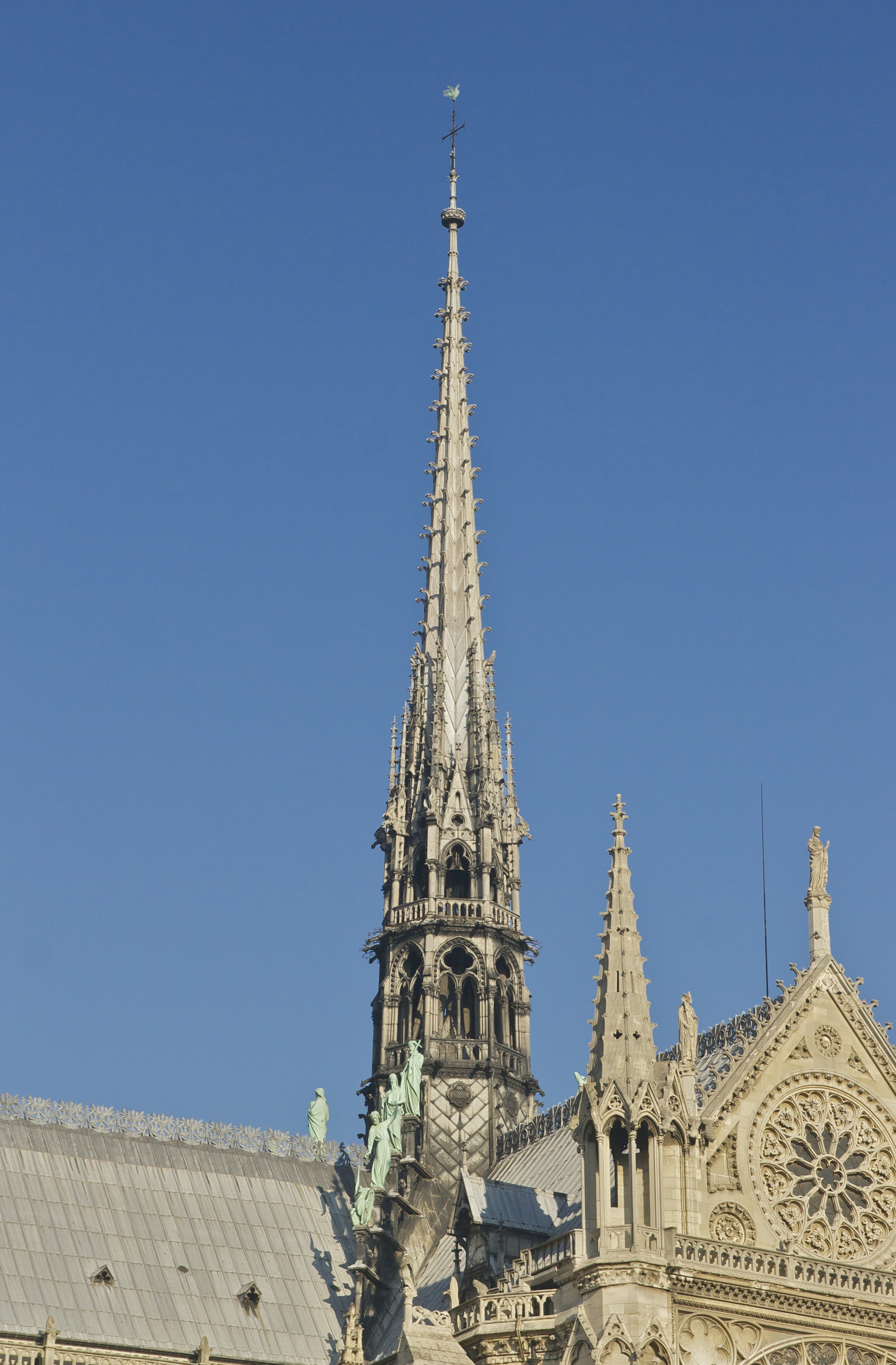
The 19th-century flèche

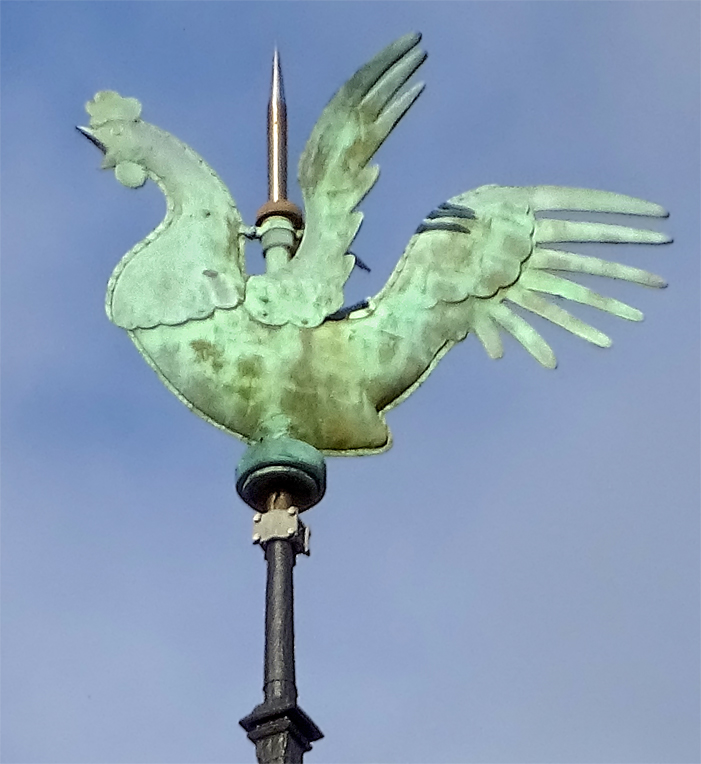
The cockerel reliquary at the top of the flèche. It was found lightly damaged in the rubble after the 2019 fire.

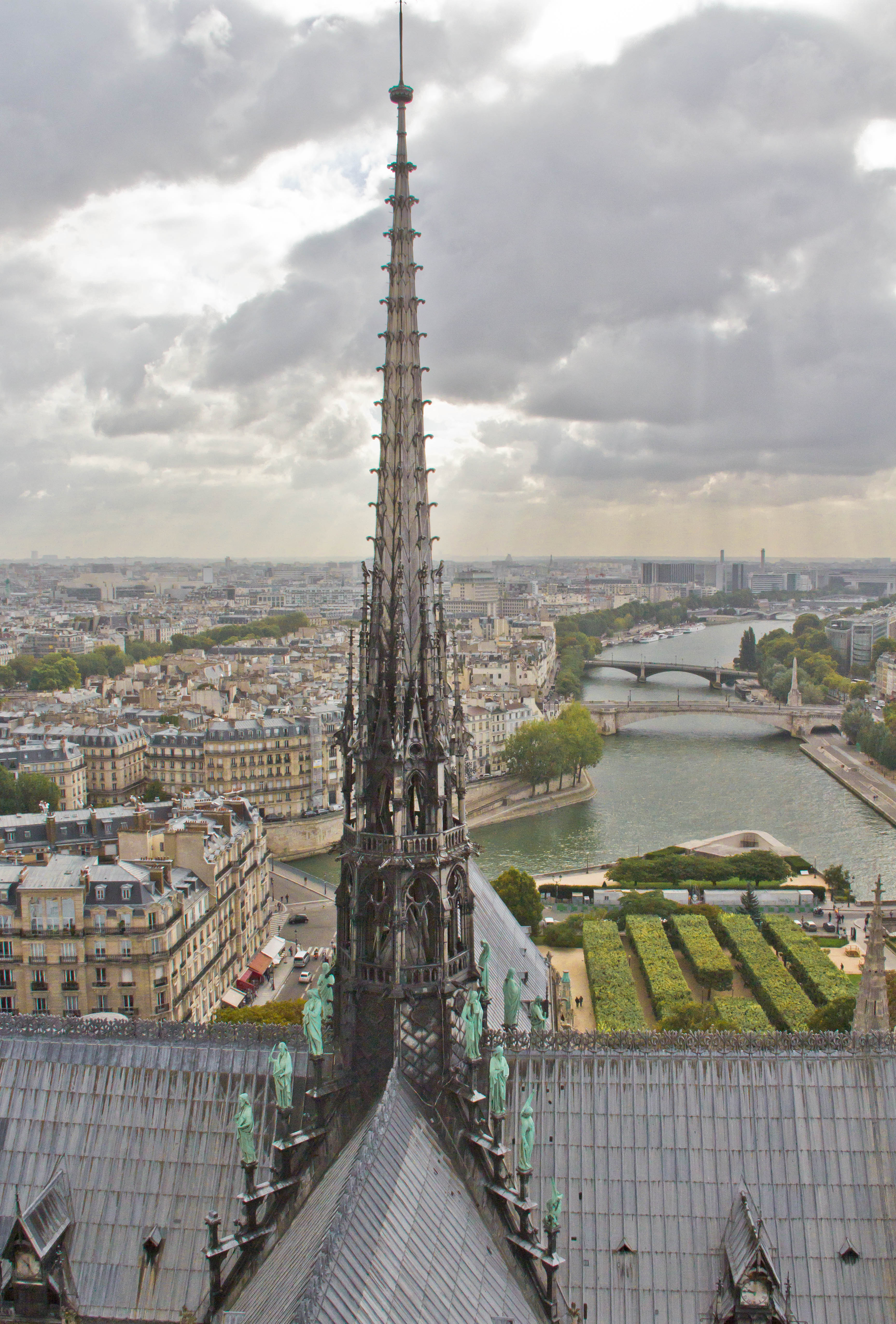
The flèche from above, in 2013

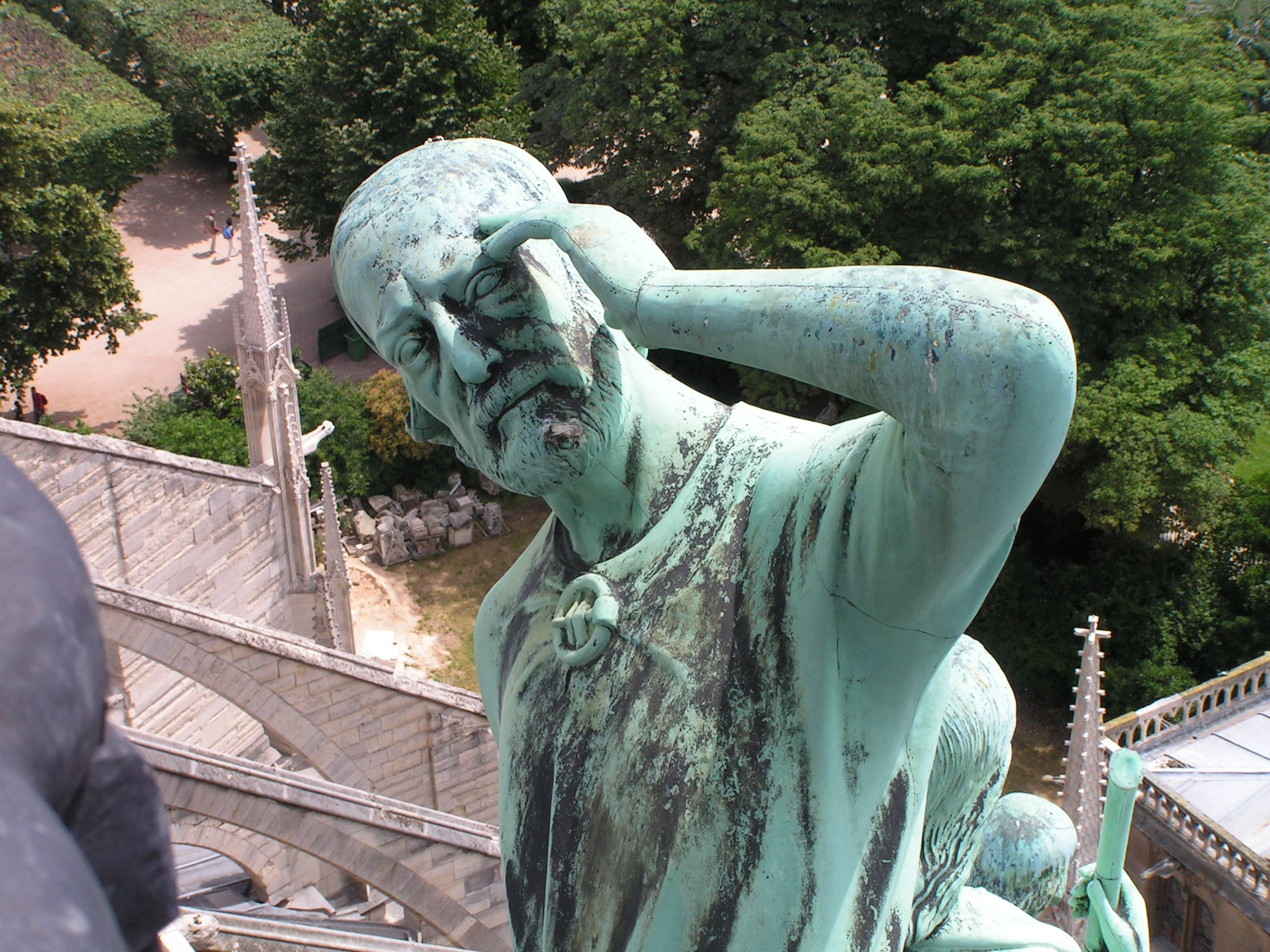
Statue of Thomas the Apostle, with the features of restorer Viollet-le-Duc, at the base of the flèche

== Iconography ==
The Gothic cathedral was a liber pauperum, a "poor people's book", covered with sculptures vividly illustrating biblical stories, for the vast majority of parishioners who were, at the time, illiterate. To add to the effect, all of the sculpture on the façades was originally painted and gilded.

The tympanum over the central portal on the west façade, facing the square, vividly illustrates the Last Judgment, with figures of sinners being led off to hell, and good Christians taken to heaven. The sculpture of the right portal shows the coronation of the Virgin Mary, and the left portal shows the lives of saints who were important to Parisians, particularly Saint Anne, the mother of the Virgin Mary.

The exteriors of cathedrals and other Gothic churches were also decorated with sculptures of grotesques or monsters. These included the gargoyle, the chimera, a mythical hybrid creature which usually had the body of a lion and the head of a goat, and the strix or stryge, a creature resembling an owl or bat, which was said to eat human flesh. The strix appeared in classical Roman literature; it was described by the Roman poet Ovid, who was widely read in the Middle Ages, as a large-headed bird with transfixed eyes, rapacious beak, and greyish white wings. They were part of the visual message for the illiterate worshipers, symbols of the evil and danger that threatened those who did not follow the teachings of the church.

The gargoyles, which were added about 1240, had a more practical purpose. They were the rain spouts of the cathedral, designed to divide the torrent of water which poured from the roof after rain, and to project it outwards as far as possible from the buttresses and the walls and windows where it might erode the mortar binding the stone. To produce many thin streams rather than a torrent of water, a large number of gargoyles were used, so they were also designed to be a decorative element of the architecture. The rainwater ran from the roof into lead gutters, then down channels on the flying buttresses, then along a channel cut in the back of the gargoyle and out of the mouth away from the cathedral.

Amid all the religious figures, some of the sculptural decoration was devoted to illustrating medieval science and philosophy. The central portal of the west façade is decorated with carved figures holding circular plaques with symbols of transformation taken from alchemy. The central pillar of the central door of Notre-Dame features a statue of a woman on a throne holding a sceptre in her left hand, and in her right hand, two books, one open (symbol of public knowledge), and the other closed (esoteric knowledge), along with a ladder with seven steps, symbolising the seven steps alchemists followed in trying to transform ordinary metals into gold. On each side of the west façade, there are statues of Ecclesia and Synagoga. The statues represent supersessionism, the Christian belief that Christianity has replaced Judaism.

Many of the statues, particularly the grotesques, were removed from the façade in the 17th and 18th centuries, or were destroyed during the French Revolution. They were replaced with figures in the Gothic style, designed by Viollet-le-Duc, during the 19th-century restoration.

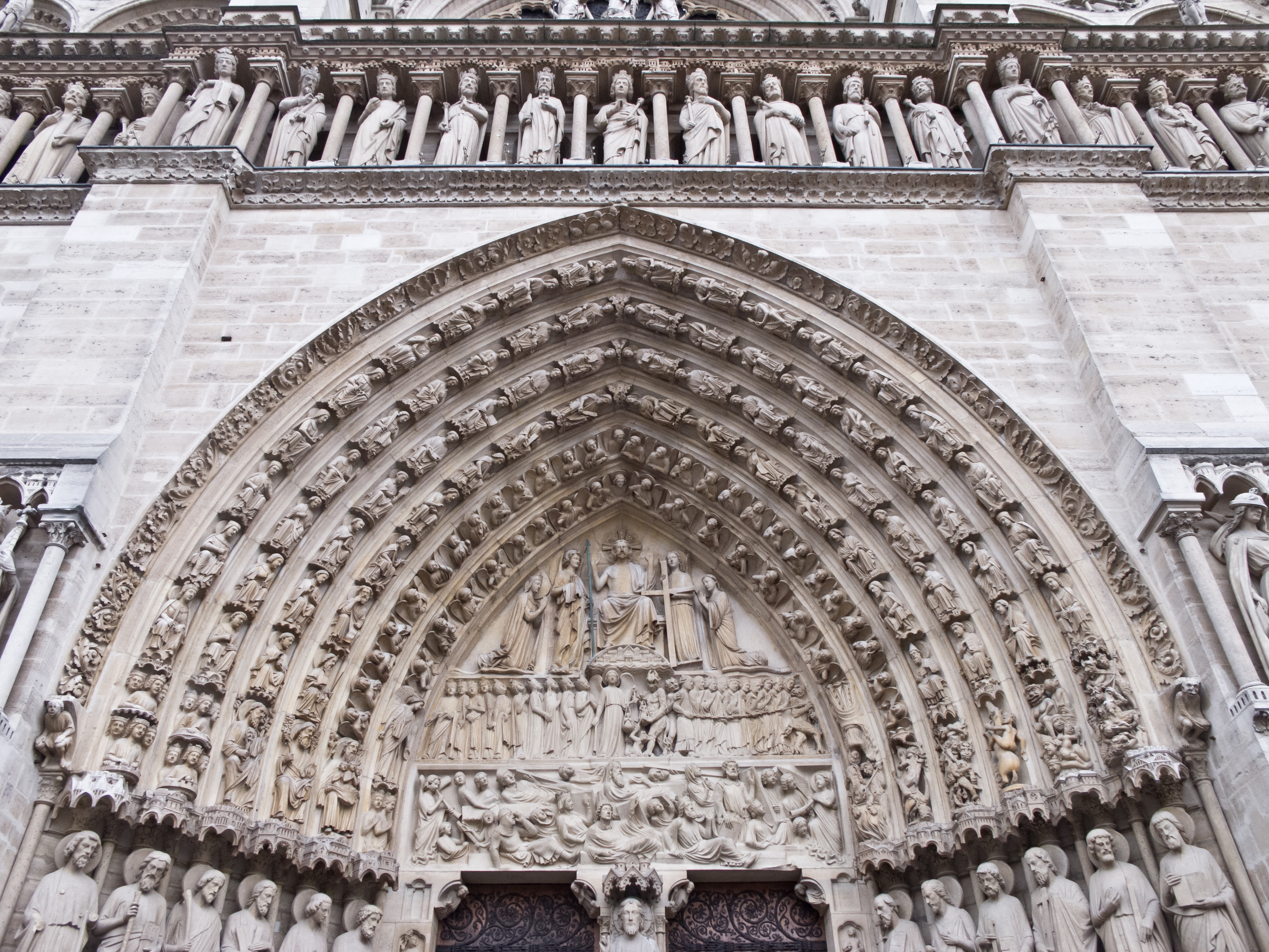
Illustration of the Last Judgment,
central portal of west façade

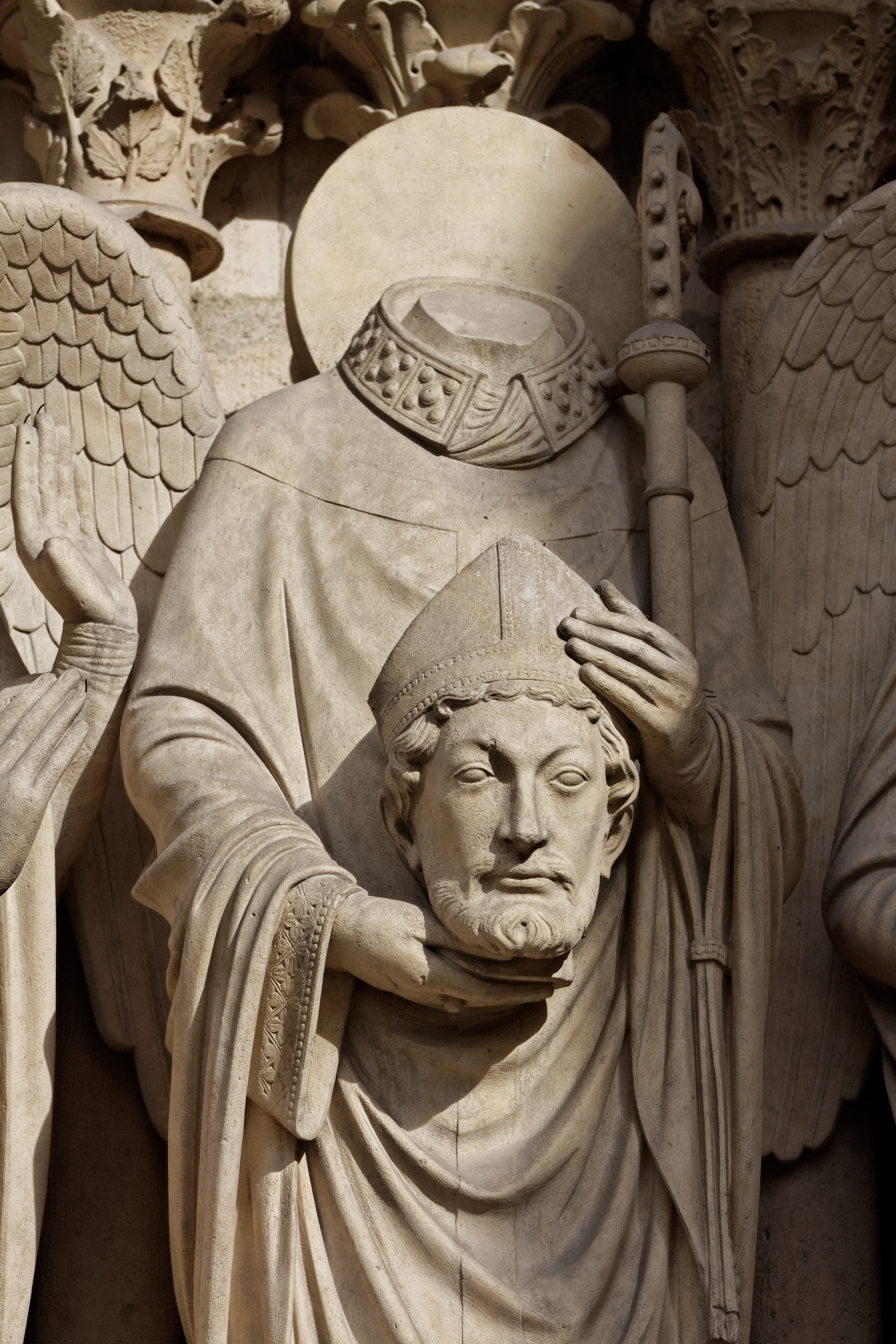
The martyr Saint Denis, holding his head, over the Portal of the Virgin

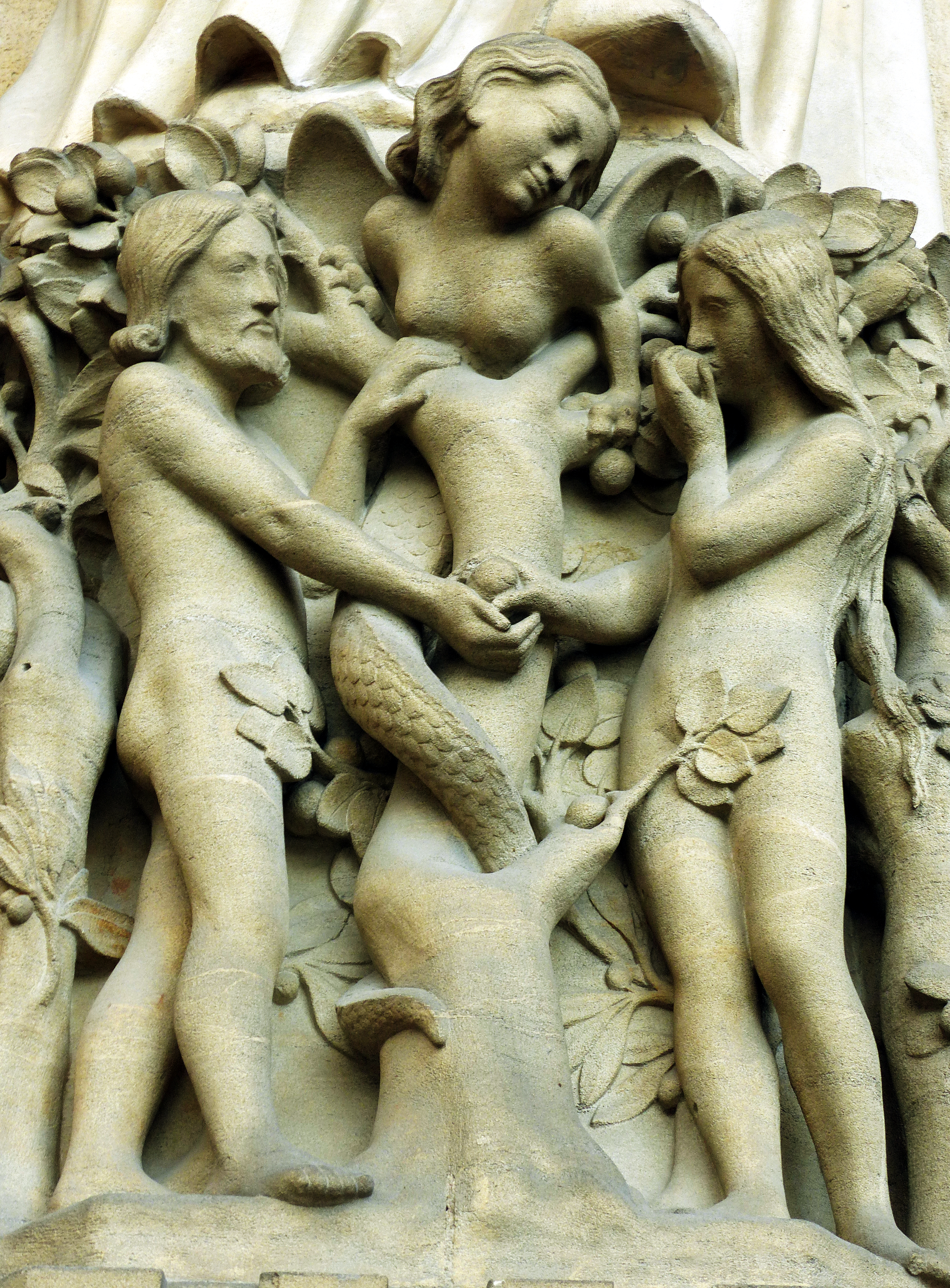
The serpent tempts Adam and Eve; on the Portal of the Virgin

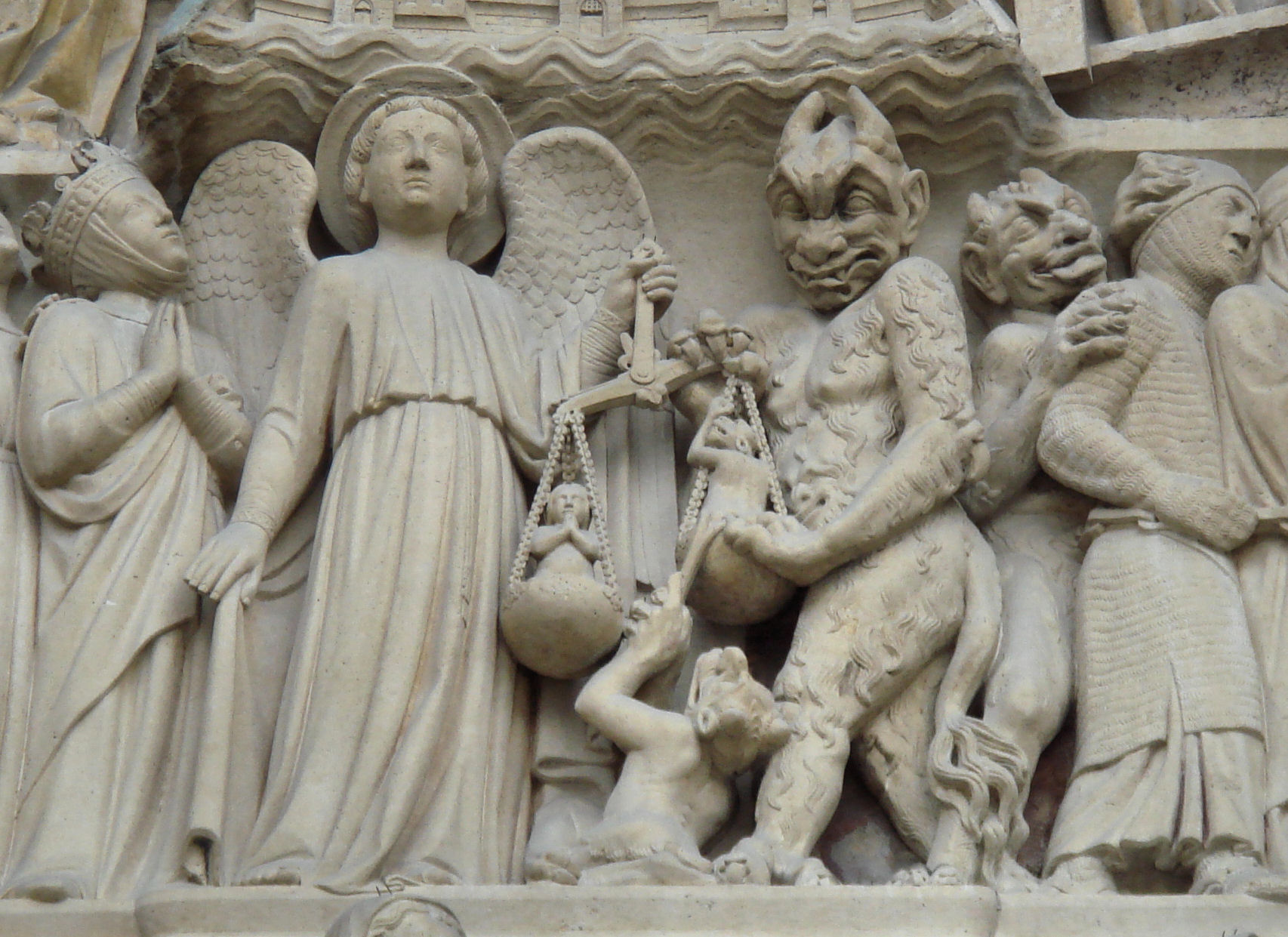
Archangel Michael and Satan weighing souls during the Last Judgment (central portal, west façade)

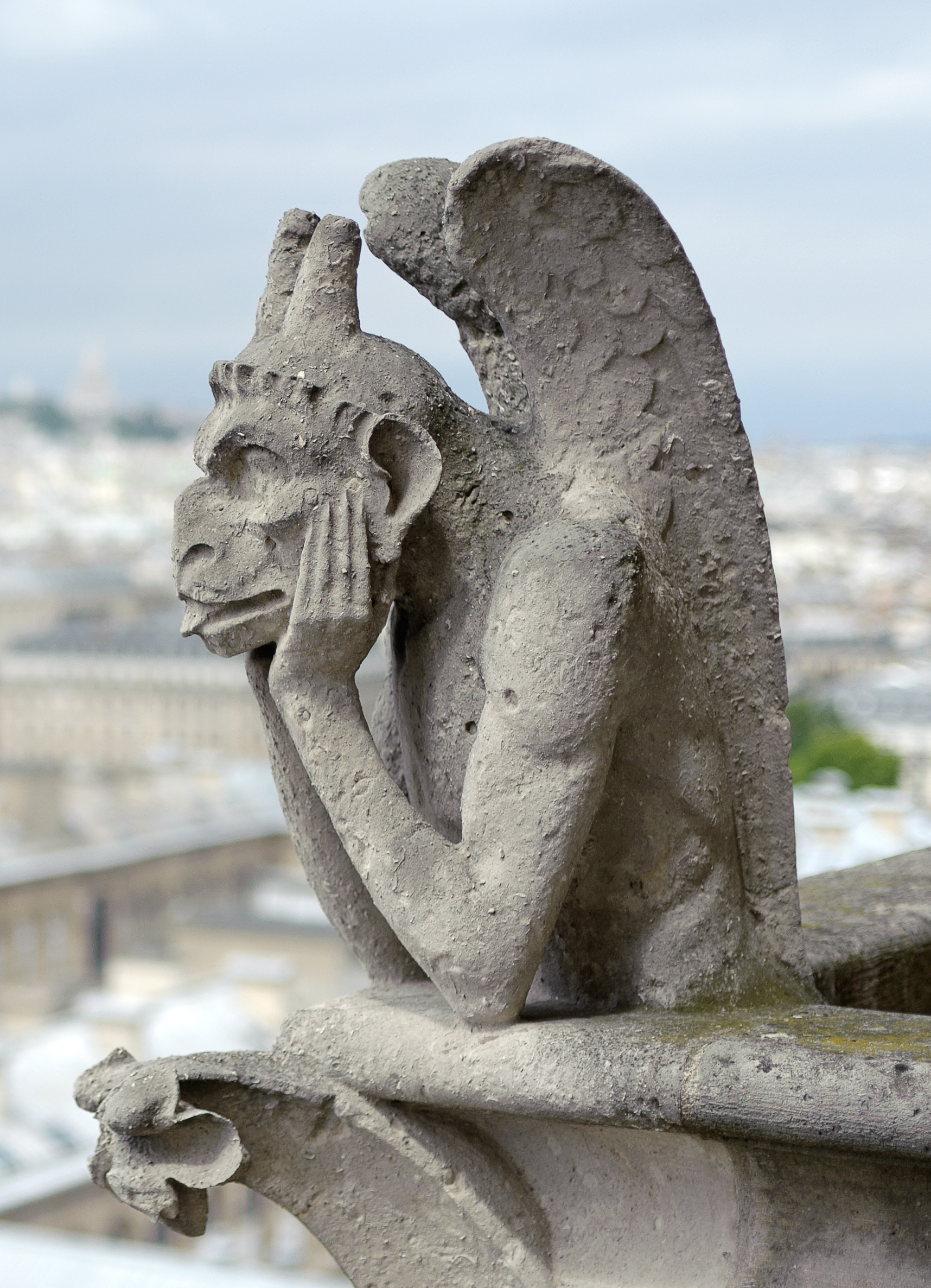
A strix on the west façade

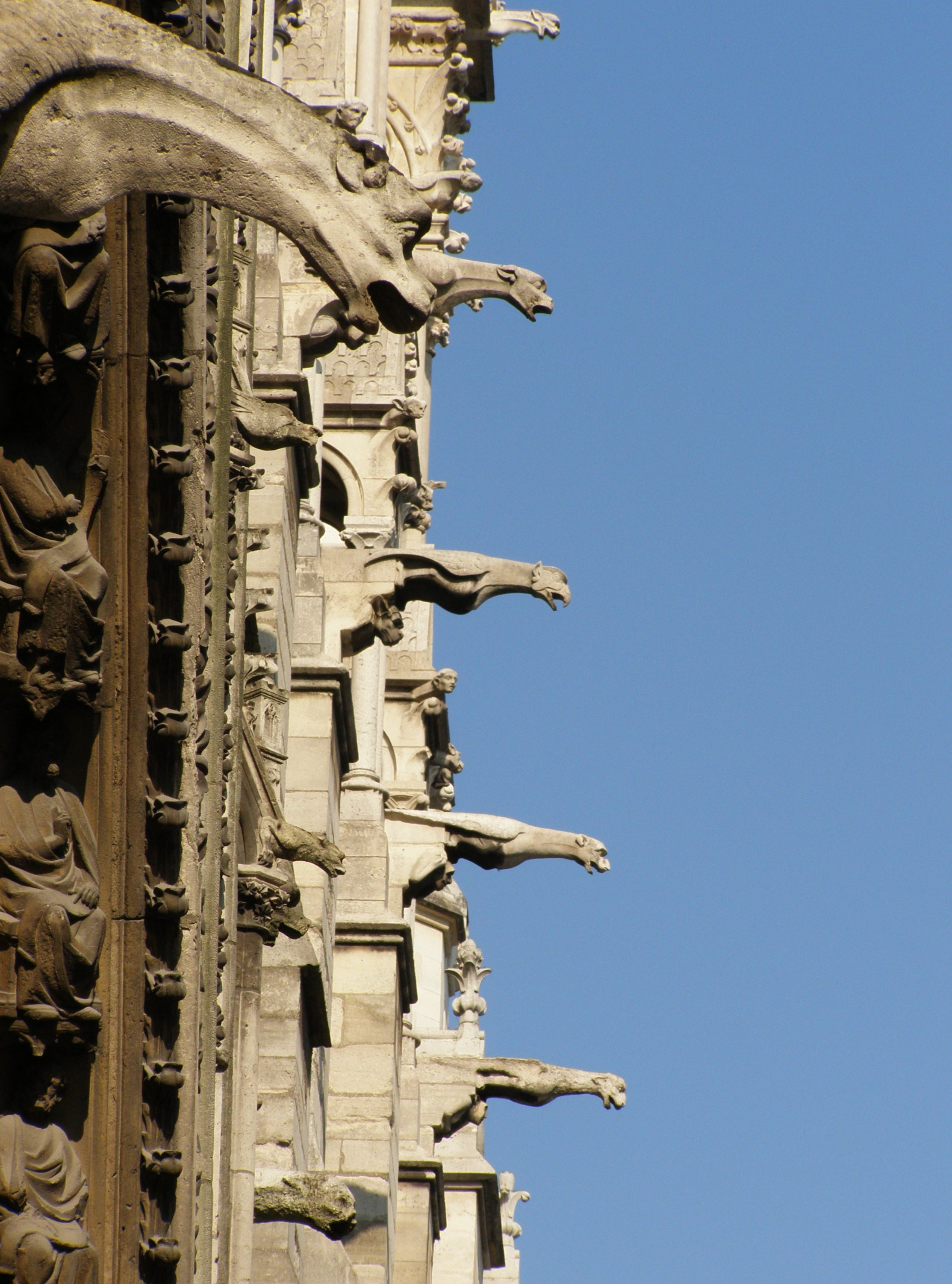
Gargoyles were the rainspouts of the cathedral

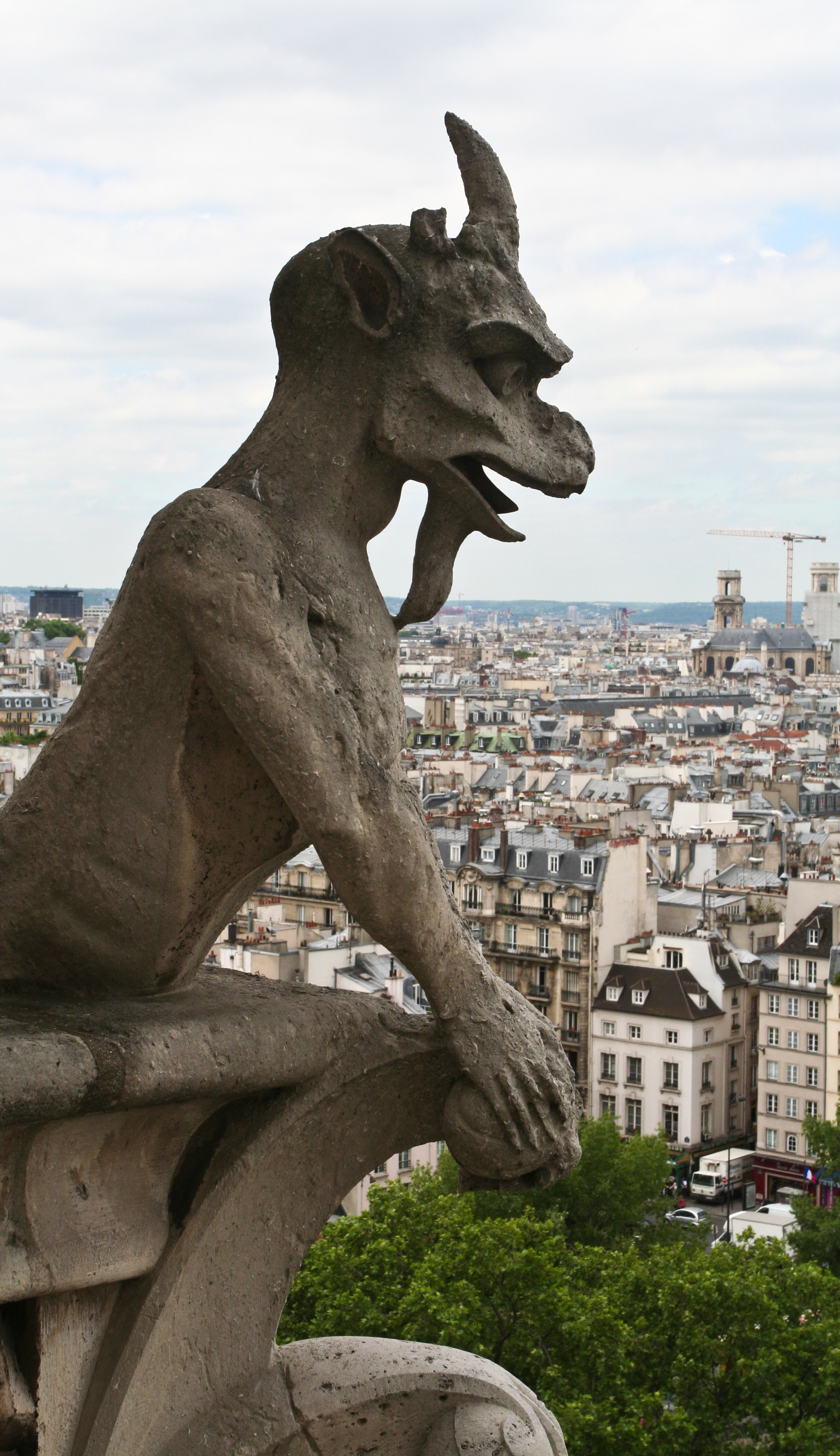
Chimera on the façade

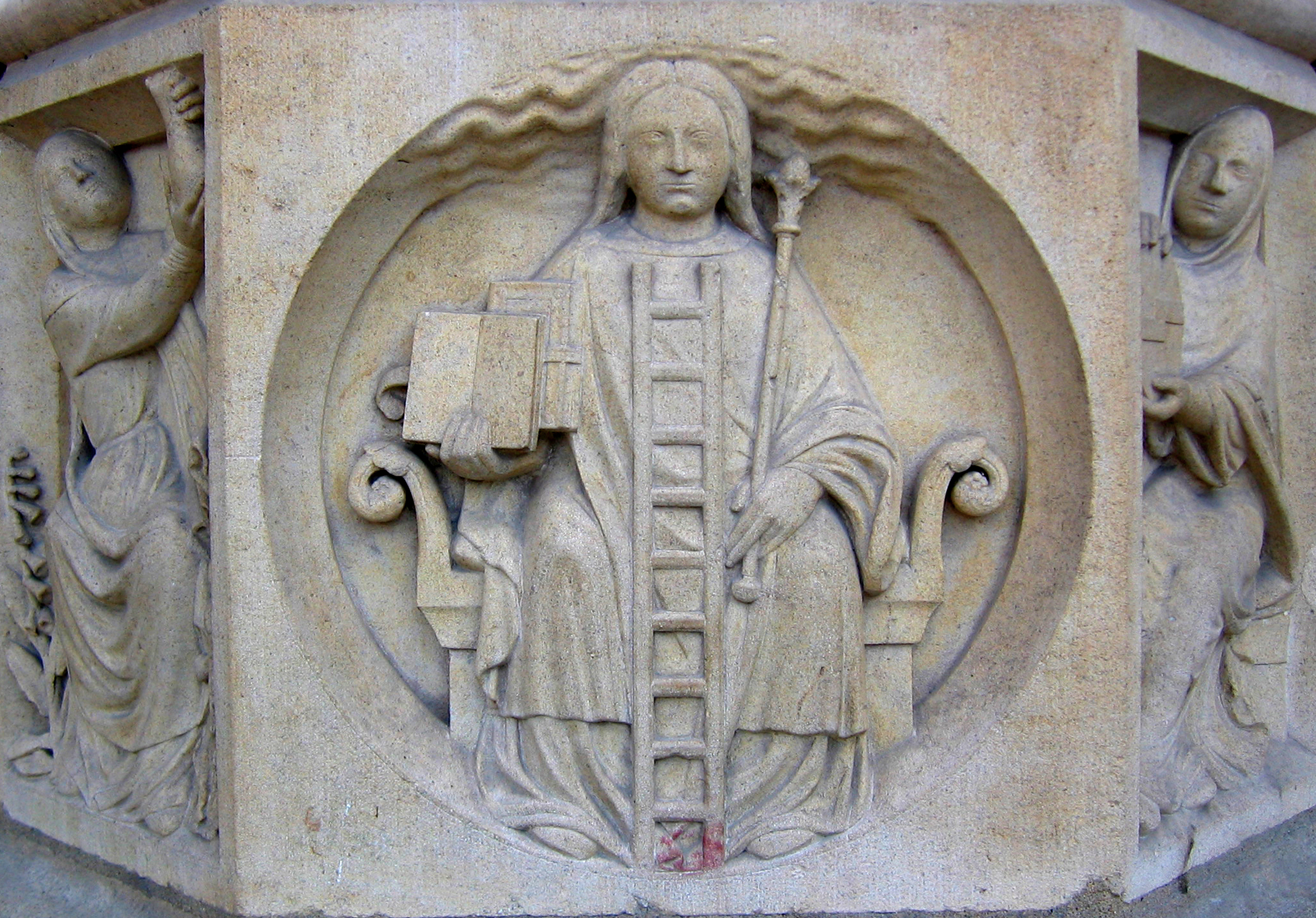
Allegory of alchemy, central portal

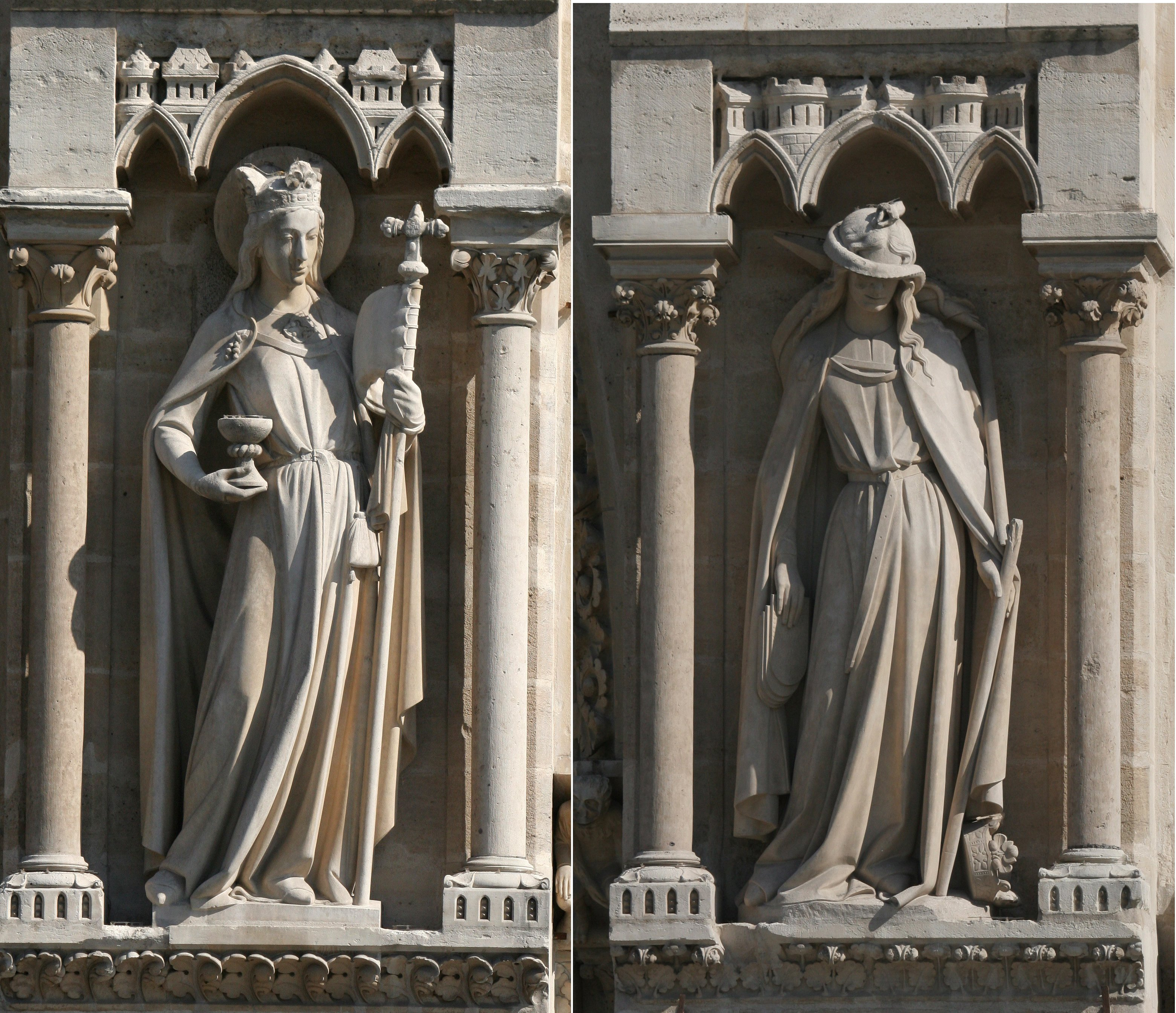
Ecclesia and Synagoga, statues on each side of the west façade

== Stained-glass windows ==
The stained-glass windows of Notre-Dame, particularly the three rose windows, are among the most famous features of the cathedral. The west rose window, over the portals, was the first and smallest of the roses in Notre-Dame. It is 9.6 metres (31 ft) in diameter, and was made in about 1225, with the pieces of glass set in a thick circular stone frame. None of the original glass remains in this window; it was recreated in the 19th century.

The two transept windows are larger and contain a greater proportion of glass than the rose on the west façade, because the new system of buttresses made the nave walls thinner and stronger. The north rose was created in about 1250, and the south rose in about 1260. The south rose in the transept is 12.9 metres (42 ft) in diameter; with the claire-voie surrounding it, a total of 19 metres (62 ft). It was given to the cathedral by King Louis IX of France, known as Saint Louis.

The south rose has 94 medallions, arranged in four circles, depicting scenes from the life of Christ and those who witnessed his time on earth. The inner circle has twelve medallions showing the twelve apostles. During later restorations, some of these original medallions were moved to circles farther out. The next two circles depict celebrated martyrs and virgins. The fourth circle shows twenty angels, and saints important to Paris, such as Saint Denis, Margaret the Virgin with a dragon, and Saint Eustace. The third and fourth circles also have some depictions of Old Testament subjects. The third circle has some medallions with scenes from the New Testament Gospel of Matthew which date from the last quarter of the 12th century. These are the oldest glass in the window.

Additional scenes in the corners around the rose window include Jesus's Descent into Hell, Adam and Eve, the Resurrection of Christ. Saint Peter and Saint Paul are at the bottom of the window, and Mary Magdalene and John the Apostle at the top.

Above the rose was a window depicting Christ triumphant seated in the sky, surrounded by his Apostles. Below are sixteen windows with painted images of Prophets. These were painted during the restoration in the 19th century by Alfred Gérenthe, under the direction of Eugène Viollet-le-Duc, based upon a similar window at Chartres Cathedral.

The south rose had a difficult history. In 1543 it was damaged by the settling of the masonry walls, and not restored until 1725–1727. It was seriously damaged in the French Revolution of 1830. Rioters burned the residence of the archbishop, next to the cathedral, and many of the panes were destroyed. The window was rebuilt by Viollet-le-Duc in 1861 who rotated it by fifteen degrees to give it a clear vertical and horizontal axis, and replaced the destroyed pieces of glass with new glass in the same style. The window now contains both medieval and 19th-century glass.

In the 1960s, after three decades of debate, it was decided to replace many of the 19th-century grisaille windows in the nave designed by Viollet-le-Duc with new windows. The new windows, made by Jacques Le Chevallier, are without human figures and use abstract designs and colour to try to recreate the luminosity of the cathedral's interior in the 13th century.

The fire left the three great medieval rose windows mostly intact, but with some damage. The rector of the cathedral noted that one rose window would have to be dismantled, as it was unstable and at risk. Most of the other damaged windows were of much less historical value.

In early 2024 Macron proposed removing six of the seven undamaged 19th-century stained-glass windows created by Eugène Viollet-le-Duc in the chapels along the south aisle of the nave, and replacing them with new windows with more contemporary designs. He invited contemporary artists to submit designs for the new windows. This proposal inspired a backlash in the press, and 140,000 people signed a petition to keep the old windows. The plan for contemporary windows was rejected by the French Commission on Architectural Monuments and Patrimony in July 2024. However, the plans went ahead, and the windows were being made as of 2026.

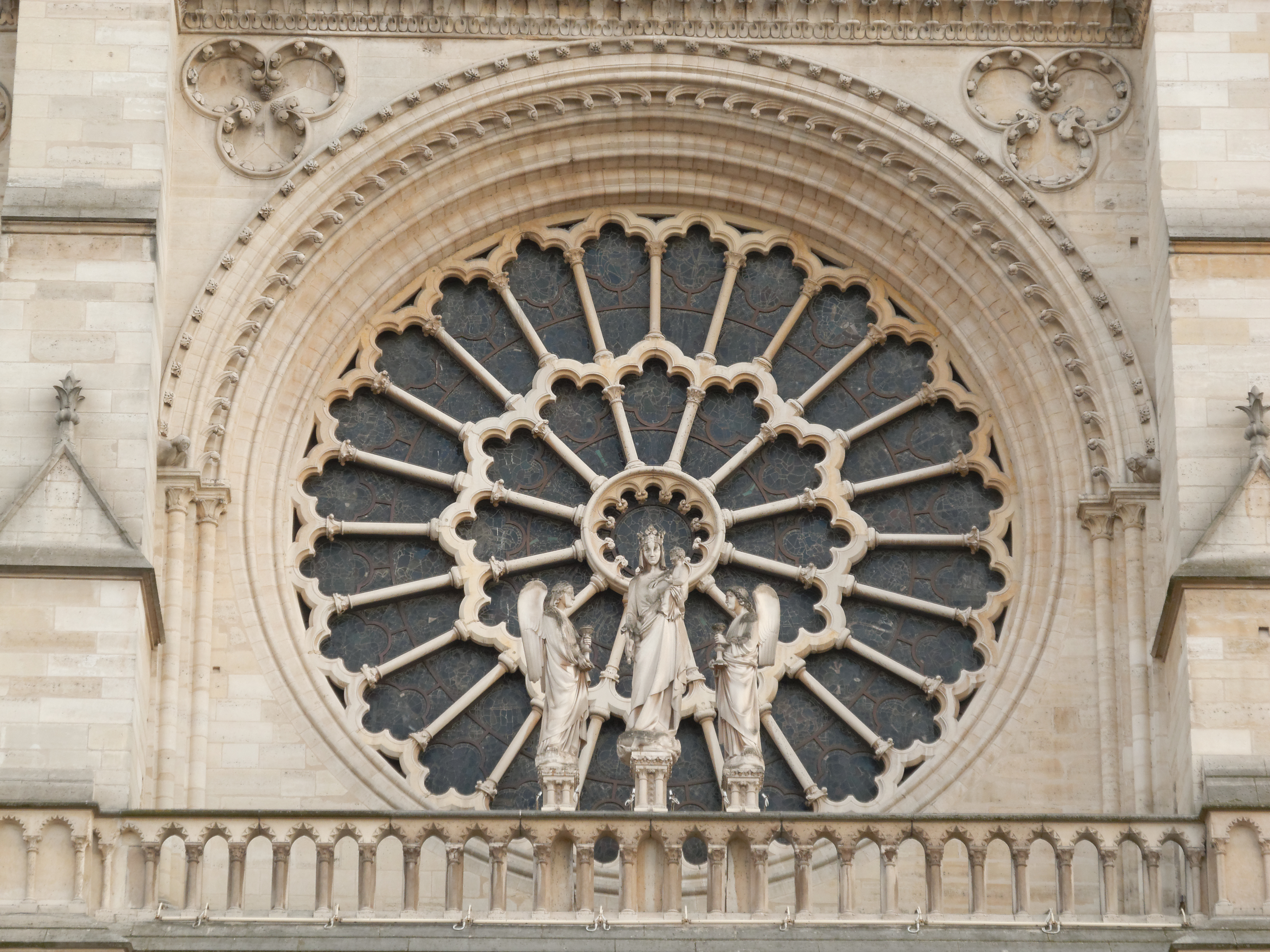
The earliest rose window, on the west façade (about 1225)

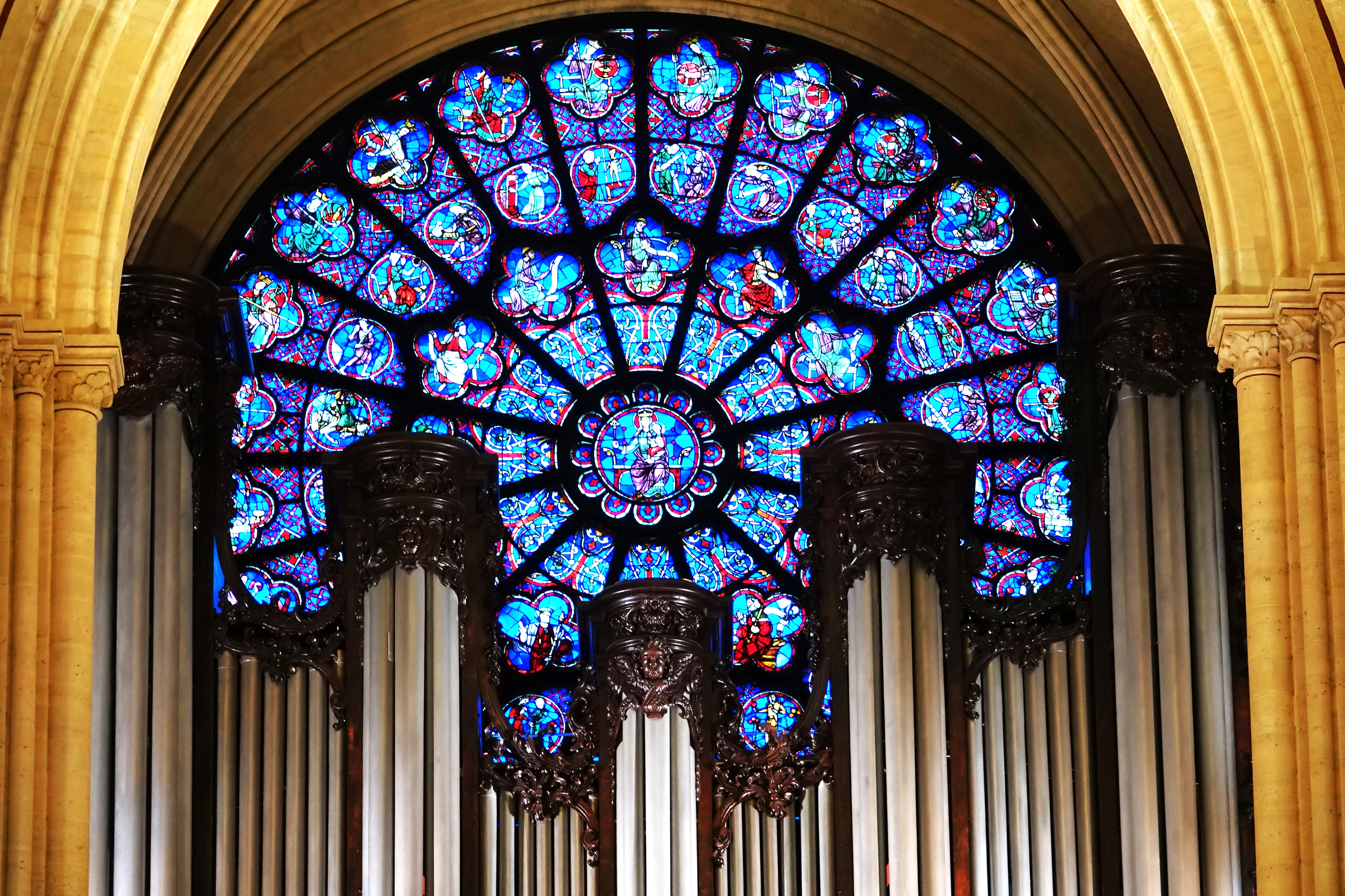
The west rose window (about 1225)

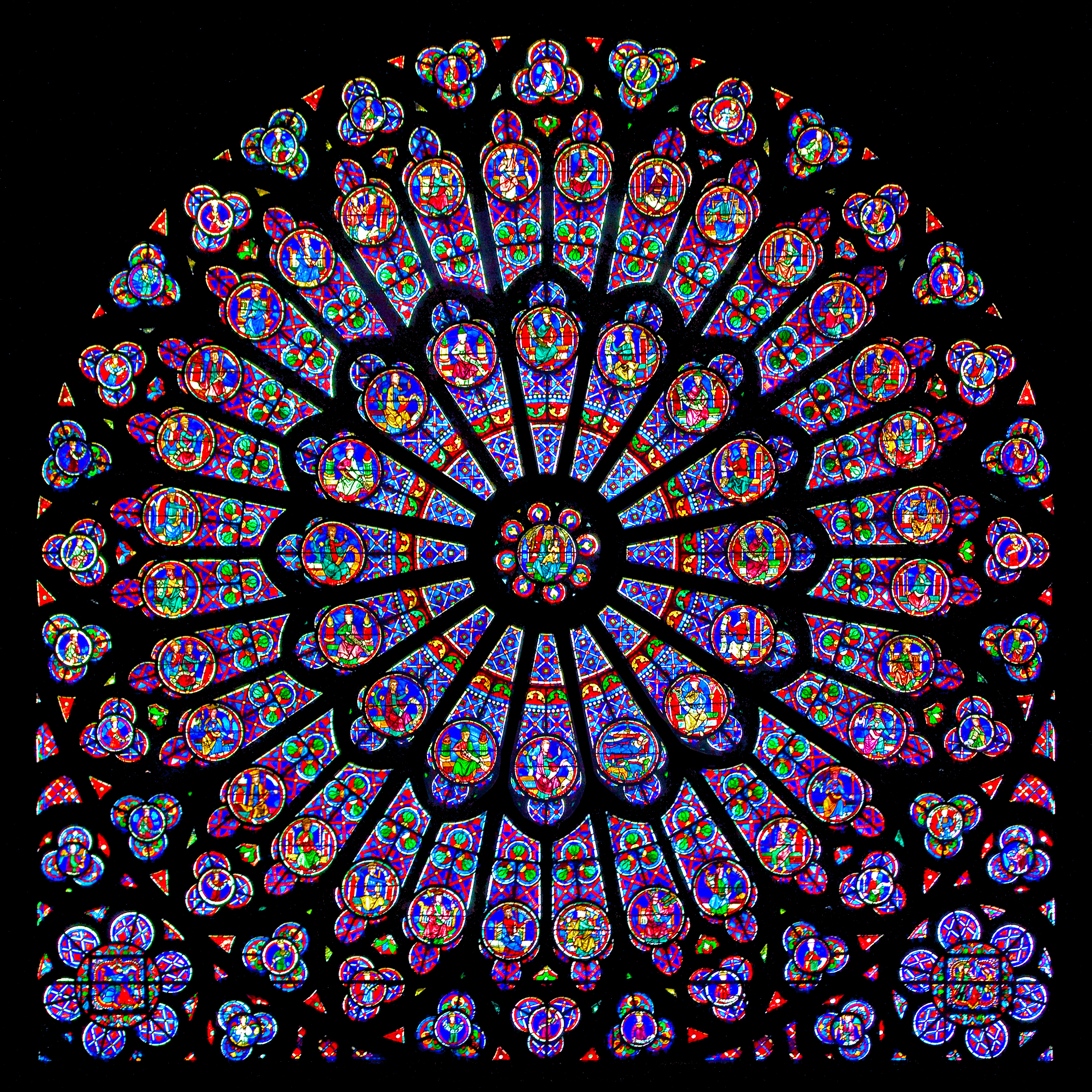
North rose window (about 1250)

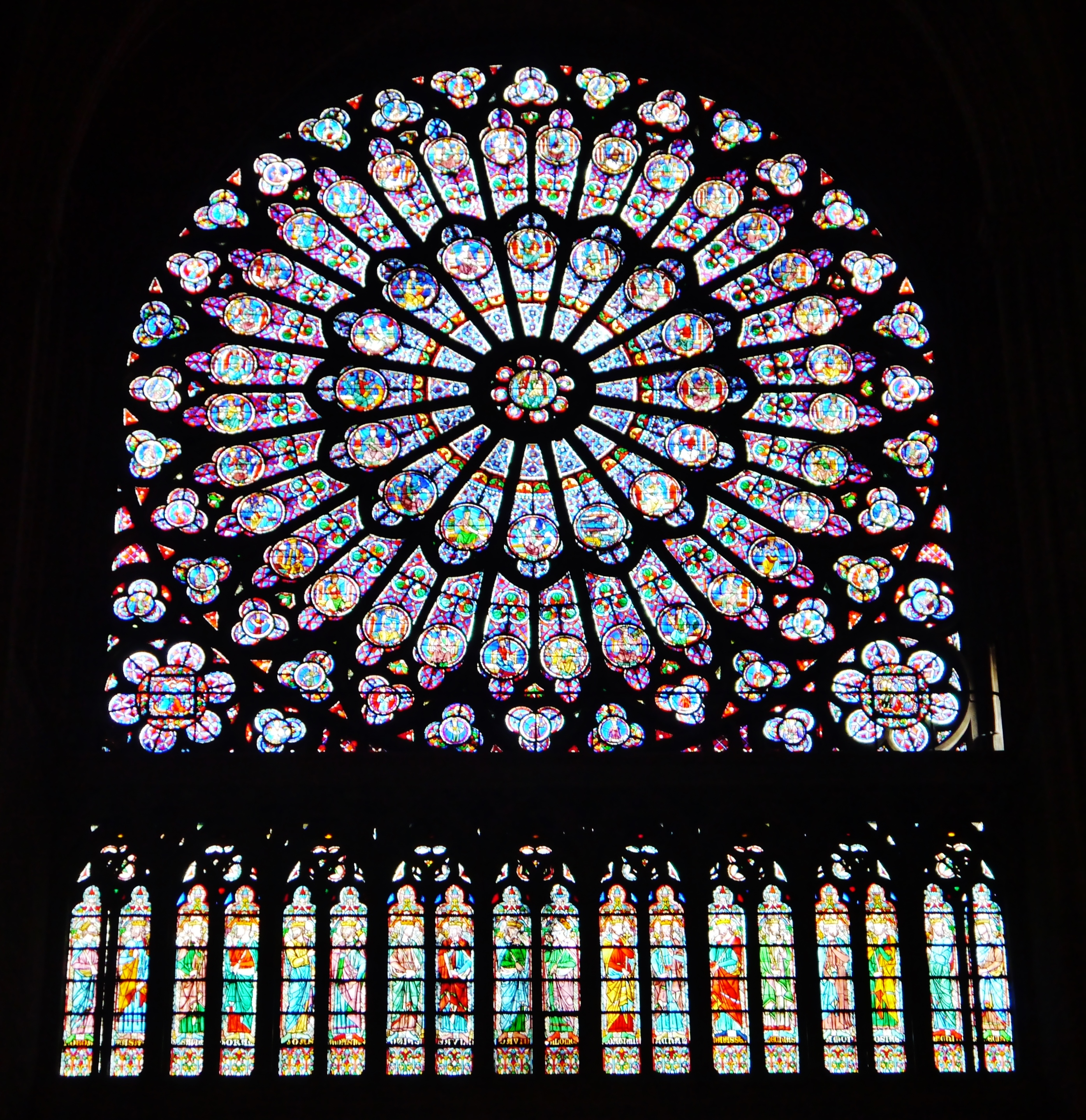
North rose window including lower 18 vertical windows

== Burials and crypts ==
Unlike some other French cathedrals, Notre-Dame was originally constructed without a crypt. In the medieval period, burials were made directly into the floor of the church, or in above-ground sarcophagi, some with tomb effigies (French: gisant). High-ranking clergy and some royals were buried in the choir and apse, and many others, including lower-ranking clergy and lay people, were buried in the nave or chapels. There is no surviving complete record of the burials.

In 1699, many of the choir tombs were disturbed or covered over during a major renovation project. Remains which were exhumed were reburied in a common tomb beside the high altar. In 1711, a small crypt measuring about six by six metres (20 by 20 ft) was dug out in the middle of the choir which was used as a burial vault for the archbishops, if they had not requested to be buried elsewhere. It was during this excavation that the 1st-century Pillar of the Boatmen was discovered. In 1758, three more crypts were dug in the Chapel of Saint-Georges to be used for burials of canons of Notre-Dame. In 1765, a larger crypt was built under the nave to be used for burials of canons, beneficiaries, chaplains, cantors, and choirboys. Between 1771 and 1773, the cathedral floor was repaved with black and white marble tiles, which covered over most of the remaining tombs. This prevented many of these tombs from being disturbed during the French Revolution.

In 1858, the choir crypt was expanded to stretch most of the length of the choir. During this project, many medieval tombs were rediscovered. Likewise the nave crypt was also rediscovered in 1863 when a larger vault was dug out to install a vault heater. Many other tombs are also located in the chapels.

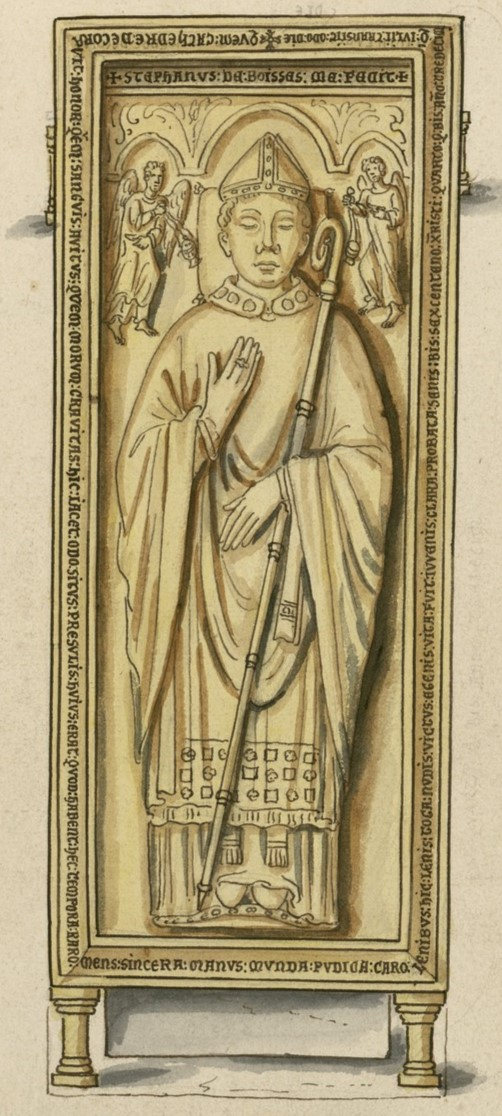
Eudes de Sully was the first bishop to be buried in Notre-Dame. His copper-covered sarcophagus was placed in the middle of the choir where it remained for almost five centuries.

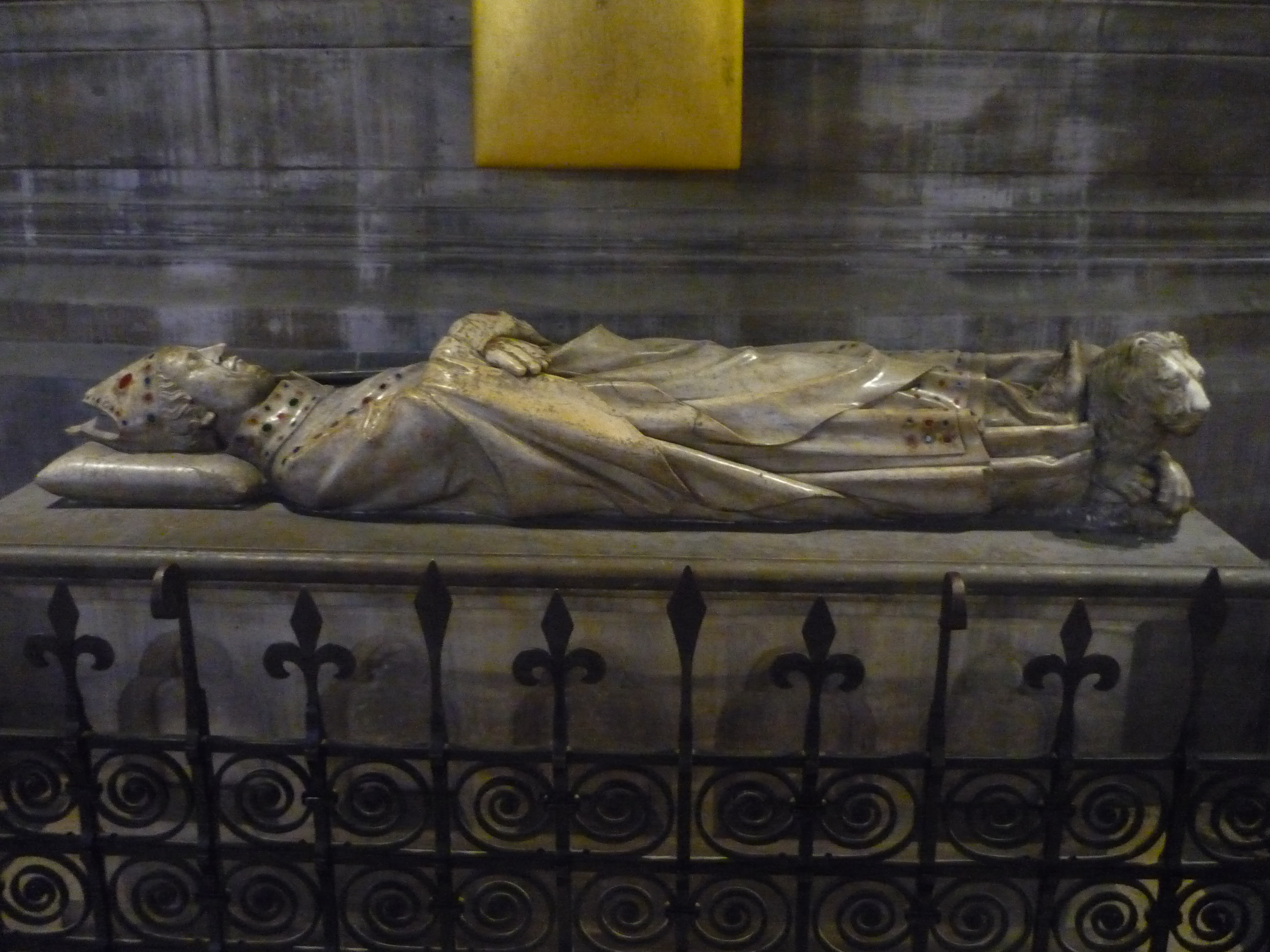
The tomb of bishop Matifort (died 1304) located behind the high altar is the only surviving medieval funerary sculpture at Notre-Dame.

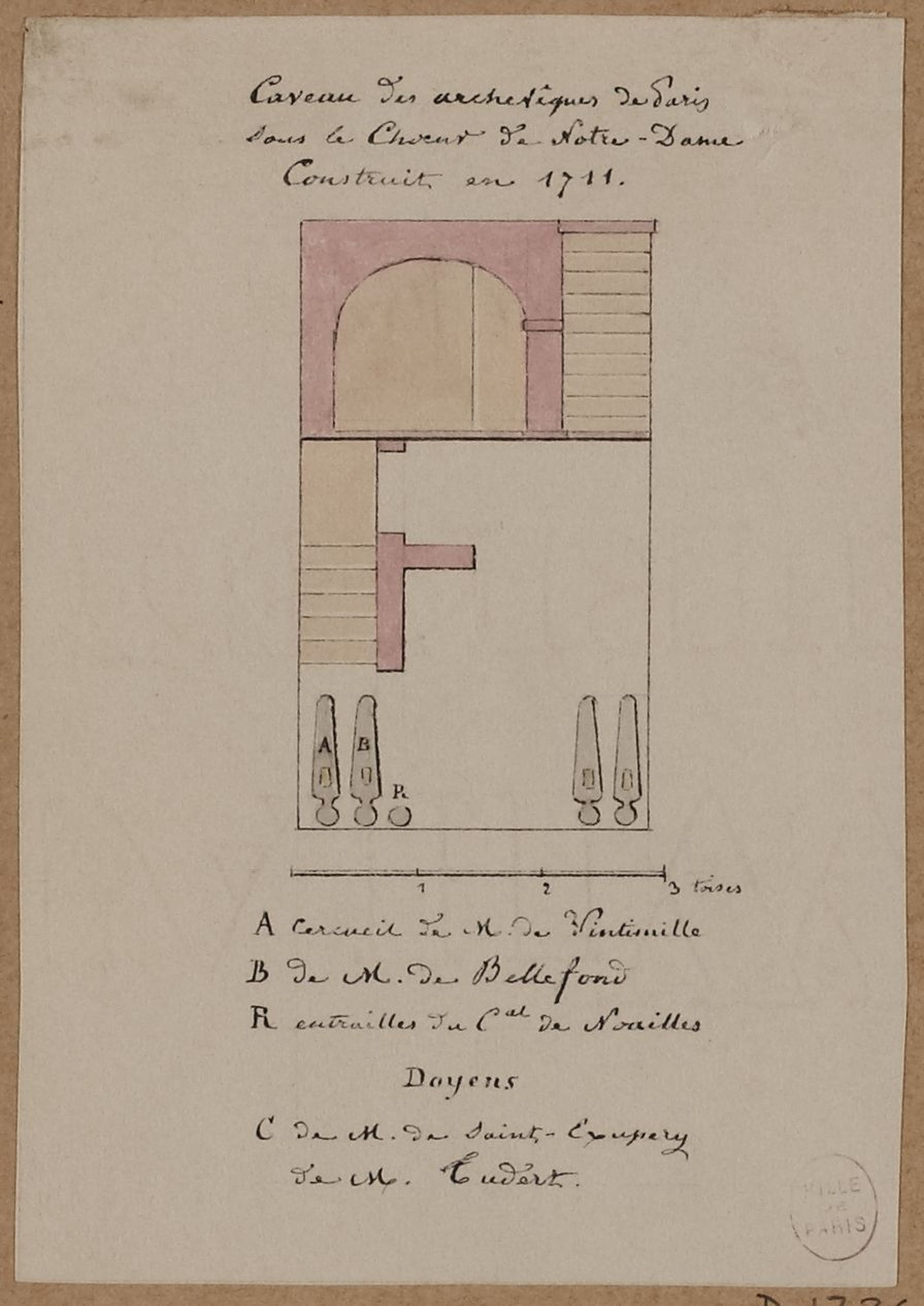
Burial vault under the choir of Notre-Dame, c. 1746. Pictured left to right are the tombs of Archbishops Vintimille and Bellefonds, the funerary urn of Archbishop Noailles, and two unidentified tombs.

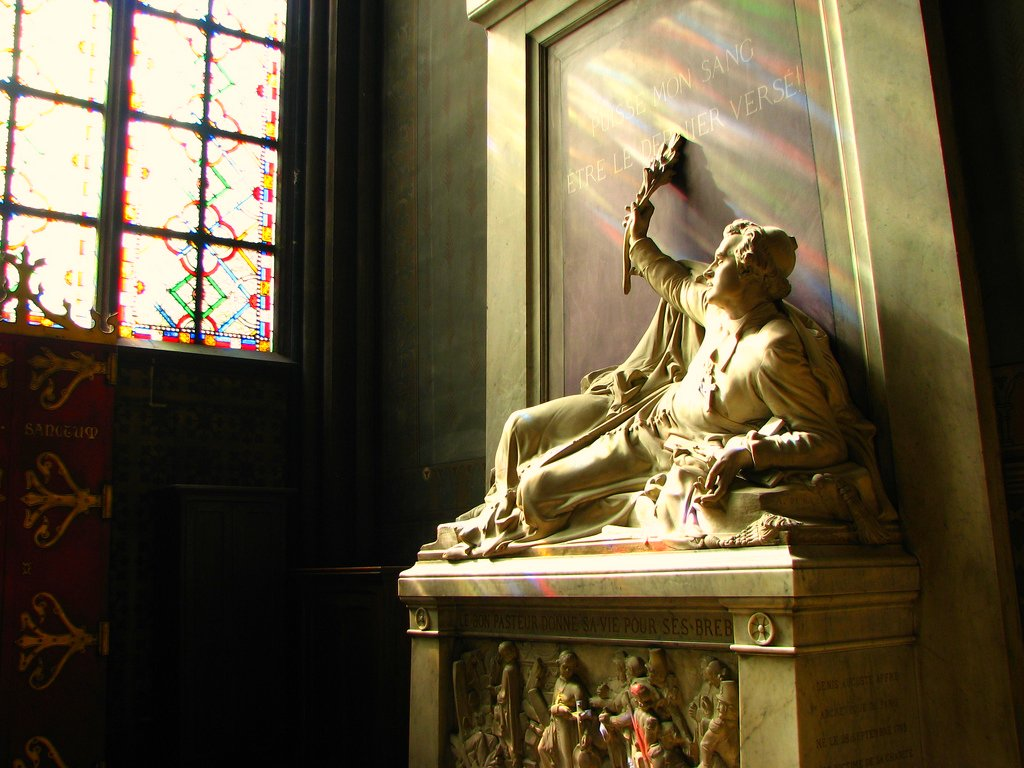
The tomb of Archbishop Affre (1793–1848) in the Chapel of Saint-Denis. The sculpture depicts the archbishop's mortal wounding during the June Days uprising while holding an olive branch as a sign of peace. The inscription reads Puisse mon sang être le dernier versé! ("May my blood be the last shed!").

== Great organ ==
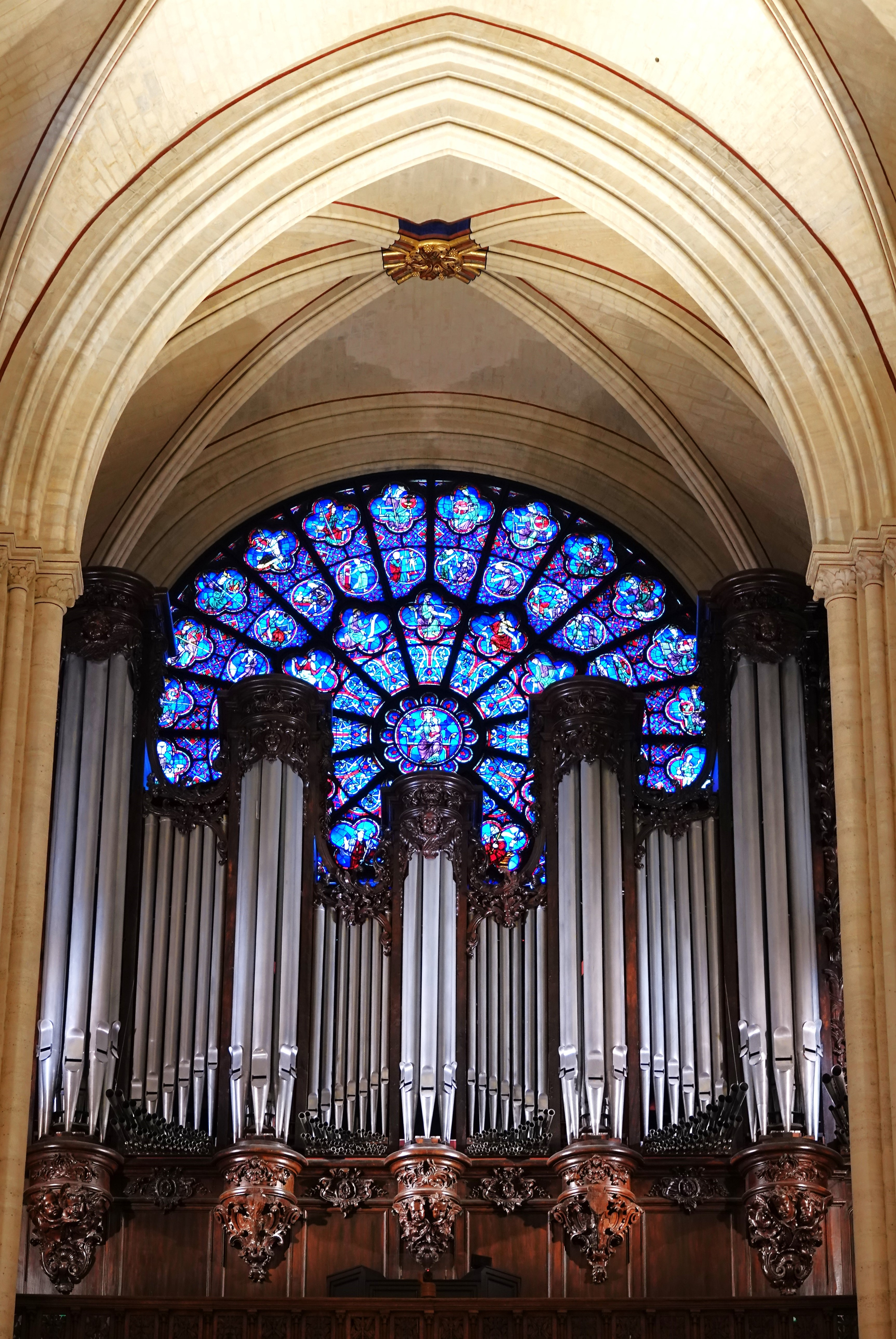
The great organ

One of the earliest organs at Notre-Dame was built in 1403 by Frédéric Schambantz. It was rebuilt many times over the course of 300 years; however, twelve pipes and some wood survive from Schambantz. It was replaced between 1730 and 1738 by François Thierry, then once again rebuilt by François-Henri Clicquot. During the mid-19th-century restoration of the cathedral by Eugène Viollet-le-Duc, Aristide Cavaillé-Coll used pipework from earlier instruments to build a new organ, which was dedicated in 1868.

In 1904, Charles Mutin modified and added several stops upon the suggestions of titular organist Louis Vierne. In 1924, the installation of an electric blower was financed by Rolls-Royce CEO Claude Johnson. An extensive restoration and cleaning was carried out by Joseph Beuchet in 1932 which mostly included changes to the Récit. Between 1959 and 1963, the mechanical action with Barker levers was replaced with an electric action by Jean Hermann, and a new organ console was installed.

The stoplist was gradually modified by Robert Boisseau, who in 1968 added three chamade stops (8′, 4′, and 2′/16′) and by Jean-Loup Boisseau after 1975, all upon the orders of Pierre Cochereau. In autumn 1983, the electric combination system was disconnected due to short-circuit risk.

Between 1990 and 1992, Jean-Loup Boisseau, Bertrand Cattiaux, Philippe Émeriau, Michel Giroud, and the Société Synaptel revised and augmented the instrument. A new frame for the Jean Hermann console was created. Between 2012 and 2014, Bertrand Cattiaux and Pascal Quoirin restored, cleaned, and modified the organ. The stop and key action was upgraded, a new frame for selected components of the Hermann-Boisseau-Cattiaux console was created, a new enclosed division ("Résonnance expressive", using pipework from the former "Petite Pédale" by Boisseau, which can now be used as a floating division), the organ case and the façade pipes were restored, and a general tuning was carried out. The current organ has 115 stops (156 ranks) on five manuals and pedal, and more than 8,000 pipes.

In addition to the great organ in the west end, the quire of the cathedral carries a medium-sized choir organ of 2 manuals, 30 stops and 37 ranks in a nineteenth-century case from the 1960s. During the fire of 2019, it was heavily damaged by waterlogging, but is at least partially reusable. It also had a 5-stop single-manual continuo organ, which was completely destroyed by water from firefighters.

The great organ itself suffered minimal damage (mostly to a single pipe of the Principal 32' and substantial dust) in the fire of April 2019 and underwent maintenance for cleaning and tuning. It was formally reblessed in 2024.

| I. Grand-Orgue C–g^{3} | II. Positif C–g^{3} | III. Récit C–g^{3} | IV. Solo C–g^{3} | V. Grand-Chœur C–g^{3} | Résonnance expressive C–g^{3} | Pédale C–f^{1}(keys go to g1, but f#1 and g1 silent) |
|---|---|---|---|---|---|---|
| Violon-Basse 16; Bourdon 16; Montre 8; Viole de Gambe 8; Flûte harmonique 8; Bourdon 8; Prestant 4; Octave 4; Doublette 2; Fourniture harmonique II-V 4; Cymbale harmonique II-V 2 2/3; Bombarde 16; Trompette 8; Clairon 4; Chamades: Chamade 8; Chamade 4; Chamade Recit 8; Cornet Recit V (from c) | Montre 16; Bourdon 16; Salicional 8; Flûte harmonique 8; Bourdon 8; Unda maris 8 (from c); Prestant 4; Flûte douce 4; Nazard 2 2/3; Doublette 2; Tierce 1 3/5; Fourniture V; Cymbale V; Clarinette basse 16; Clarinette 8; Clarinette aiguë 4 | Récit expressif: Quintaton 16; Diapason 8; Flûte traversière 8; Viole de Gambe 8; Bourdon céleste 8 (from c); Voix céleste 8 (from c); Octave 4; Flûte Octaviante 4; Quinte 2 2/3; Octavin 2; Bombarde 16; Trompette 8; Basson-Hautbois 8; Clarinette 8; Voix humaine 8; Clairon 4; Récit classique: (from f); Cornet V 8; Hautbois 8; Chamades: Basse Chamade 8; Dessus Chamade 8; Chamade 4; Chamade Régale 8; Basse Chamade GO 8; Dessus Chamade GO 8; Chamade GO 4; Trémolo | Bourdon 32 (lowest octave acoustic); Principal 16; Montre 8; Flûte harmonique 8; Quinte 5 1/3; Prestant 4; Tierce 3 1/5; Nazard 2 2/3; Septième 2 2/7; Doublette 2; Cornet II-V 2 2/3; Grande Fourniture II 2 2/3; Fourniture V; Cymbale V; Cromorne 8; Chamade GO 8; Chamade GO 4; Cornet Récit V; Hautbois Récit 8 (above stops: f-g3, outside swell box) | Principal 8; Bourdon 8 *; Prestant 4 *; Quinte 2 2/3 *; Doublette 2 *; Tierce 1 3/5 *; Larigot 1 1/3; Septième 1 1/7; Piccolo 1; Plein jeu III-V 2/3; Tuba magna 16; Trompette 8; Clairon 4; Cornet V 8 (pulls out stops with asterisks) | Bourdon 16; Principal 8; Bourdon 8; Prestant 4; Flûte 4; Neuvième 3 5/9; Tierce 3 1/5; Onzième 2 10/11; Nazard 2 2/3; Flûte 2; Tierce 1 3/5; Larigot 1 1/3; Flageolet 1; Fourniture III; Cymbale III; Basson 16; Basson 8; Voix humaine 8; Chimes; Tremblant | Principal 32; Contrebasse 16; Soubasse 16; Quinte 10 2/3; Flûte 8; Violoncelle 8; Tierce 6 2/5; Quinte 5 1/3; Septième 4 4/7; Octave 4; Contre-Bombarde 32; Bombarde 16; Basson 16; Trompette 8; Basson 8; Clairon 4; Chamade GO 8; Chamade GO 4; Chamade Récit 8; Chamade Récit 4; Régale 2/16 |

Couplers: II/I, III/I, IV/I, V/I; III/II, IV/II, V/II; IV/III, V/III; V/IV, Octave grave général, inversion Positif/Grand-orgue, Tirasses (Grand-orgue, Positif, Récit, Solo, Grand-Chœur en 8; Grand-Orgue en 4, Positif en 4, Récit en 4, Solo en 4, Grand-Chœur en 4), Sub and Super octave couplers and Unison Off for all manuals (Octaves graves, octaves aiguës, annulation 8′); octaves aiguës Pédalier

Additional features: Coupure Pédalier; Coupure Chamade; Appel Résonnance; sostenuto for all manuals and the pedal; cancel buttons for each division; 50,000 combinations (5,000 groups each); replay system

=== Organists ===
The position of titular organist ("head" or "chief" organist; French: titulaires des grandes orgues) of the great organ of Notre-Dame is considered one of the most prestigious organist posts in France, along with the post of titular organist of Saint Sulpice in Paris, Cavaillé-Coll's largest instrument.

After the death of Pierre Cochereau, the cathedral authorities controversially decided to return to the Clicquot practice of having several titulaires, and also to guarantee that no one organist would have so much influence over the organ.

- Guillaume Maingot (1600–1609)
- Jacques Petitjean (1609–1610)
- Charles Thibault (1610–1616)
- Charles Racquet (1618–1643)
- Jean Racquet (c. 1643–1689)
- Médéric Corneille (1689–1730)
- Guillaume-Antoine Calvière (1730–1755)
- René Drouart de Bousset (1755–1760)
- Charles-Alexandre Jollage (1755–1761)
- Louis-Claude Daquin (1755–1772)
- Armand-Louis Couperin (1755–1789)
- Claude Balbastre (1760–1793)
- Pierre-Claude Foucquet (1761–1772)
- Nicolas Séjan (1772–1793)
- Claude-Étienne Luce (1772–1783)
- Jean-Jacques Beauvarlet Charpentier (1783–1793)
- Antoine Desprez (1802–1806)
- François Lacodre dit Blin (1806–1834)
- Joseph Pollet (1834–1840)
- Félix Danjou (1840–1847)
- Eugène Sergent (1847–1900)
- Louis Vierne (1900–1937)
- Léonce de Saint-Martin (1937–1954)
- Pierre Cochereau (1955–1984)
- Yves Devernay (1985–1990)
- Jean-Pierre Leguay (1985–2015)
- Philippe Lefebvre (1985–2019)
- Olivier Latry (since 1985)
- Vincent Dubois (since 2016)
- Thierry Escaich (since 2024)
- Thibault Fajoles (assistant organist, since 2024)

== Music ==
During the late 12th and early 13th centuries, while the present Gothic cathedral was under construction, Notre-Dame de Paris became the birthplace and leading centre of the Notre-Dame school of polyphony.

== Bells ==
Emmanuel's volley solo

Notre-Dame currently has ten bells. The two largest bells, Emmanuel and Marie, are mounted in the south tower. The eight others; Gabriel, Anne Geneviève, Denis, Marcel, Étienne, Benoît-Joseph, Maurice, and Jean-Marie; are mounted in the north tower. All 10 bells of the cathedral are tuned to the F# major scale, spanning more than an octave.

Emmanuel (originally named Jacqueline) is Notre-Dame's oldest bell, was cast in 1686. Marie the second bourdon was cast in 2012, by the Royal Eijsbouts foundry in the Netherlands. The 8 smaller bells in the north tower were cast in 2013 by the Cornille-Havard foundry in France.

In addition to accompanying regular activities at the cathedral, the bells have also rung to commemorate events of national and international significance, such as the armistice of 11 November 1918, the liberation of Paris, the fall of the Berlin Wall, and the September 11 attacks.

The bells are made with bronze for its resonance and resistance to corrosion. During the medieval period, they were often founded on the grounds of the cathedral so they would not need to be transported long distances. According to tradition, the bishop of Paris held a ceremony in which he blessed and baptized the bells, and a godparent formally bestowed a name on the bell. Most of the cathedral's early bells were named after the person who donated them, but they were also named after biblical figures, saints, bishops, and others.

After the baptism, the bells were hoisted into the towers through circular openings in the vaulted ceilings and mounted to headstocks to allow the bells to swing. Notre-Dame's bells swing on a straight swinging axis, meaning the axis of rotation is just above the crown of the bell. This style of ringing produces a clearer tone, as the clapper strikes the bell on the upswing, called a flying clapper. It also causes horizontal forces, which can be up to one and a half times the weight of the bell. For this reason the bells are mounted within wooden belfries which are recessed from the towers' stone walls. These absorb the horizontal forces and prevent the bells from damaging the relatively brittle stonework. The current belfries date to the 19th-century restoration.

Before the French Revolution, it was common for the bells to break, and they were often removed for repairs or to be entirely recast, and sometimes renamed. The bell Guillaume, for example, was renamed three times and recast five times between 1230 and 1770.

The practice of bell-ringing at Notre-Dame is recorded as early as 1198. By the end of the 14th century the bells were marking the civil hours, and in 1472 they began to call to prayer for the Angelus three times a day, both practices which continue today. During the French Revolution, most of the cathedral's bells were removed and melted down. Many of them bore the names of the medieval bells, and were relatively recent recastings made from most of the same metal. During the 19th-century restoration, four new bells were made for the north tower. These were replaced in 2012 with nine as part of the cathedral's 850th anniversary celebration.

In addition to the main bells, the cathedral also had smaller secondary bells. These included a carillon in the medieval flèche, three clock bells on the north transept in the 18th century, and six bells added in the 19th century – three in the reconstructed flèche and three within the roof to be heard in the sanctuary. These were destroyed during the 2019 fire.

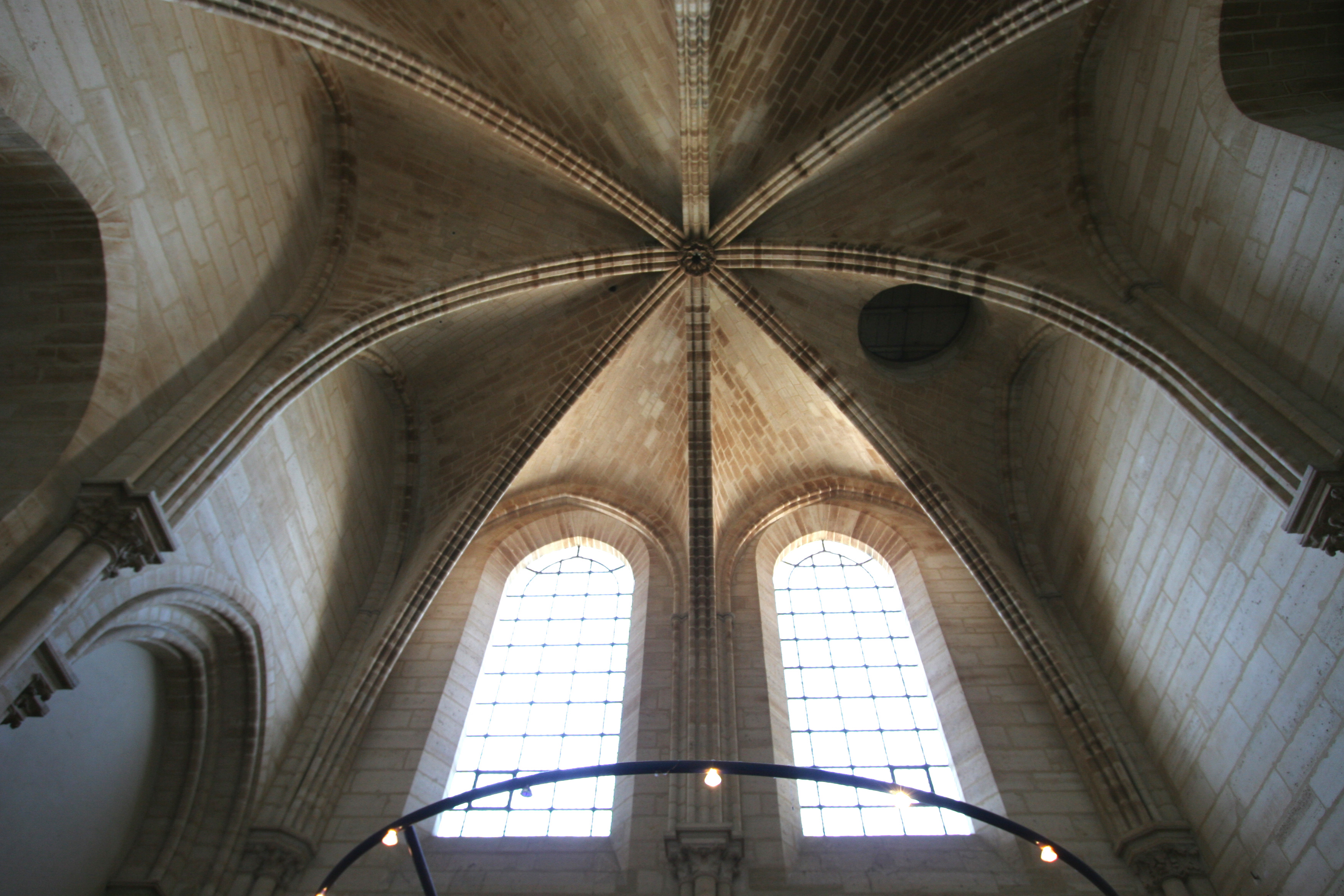
Circular utility door (right of center) in the ceiling below the north tower made for raising and lowering bells

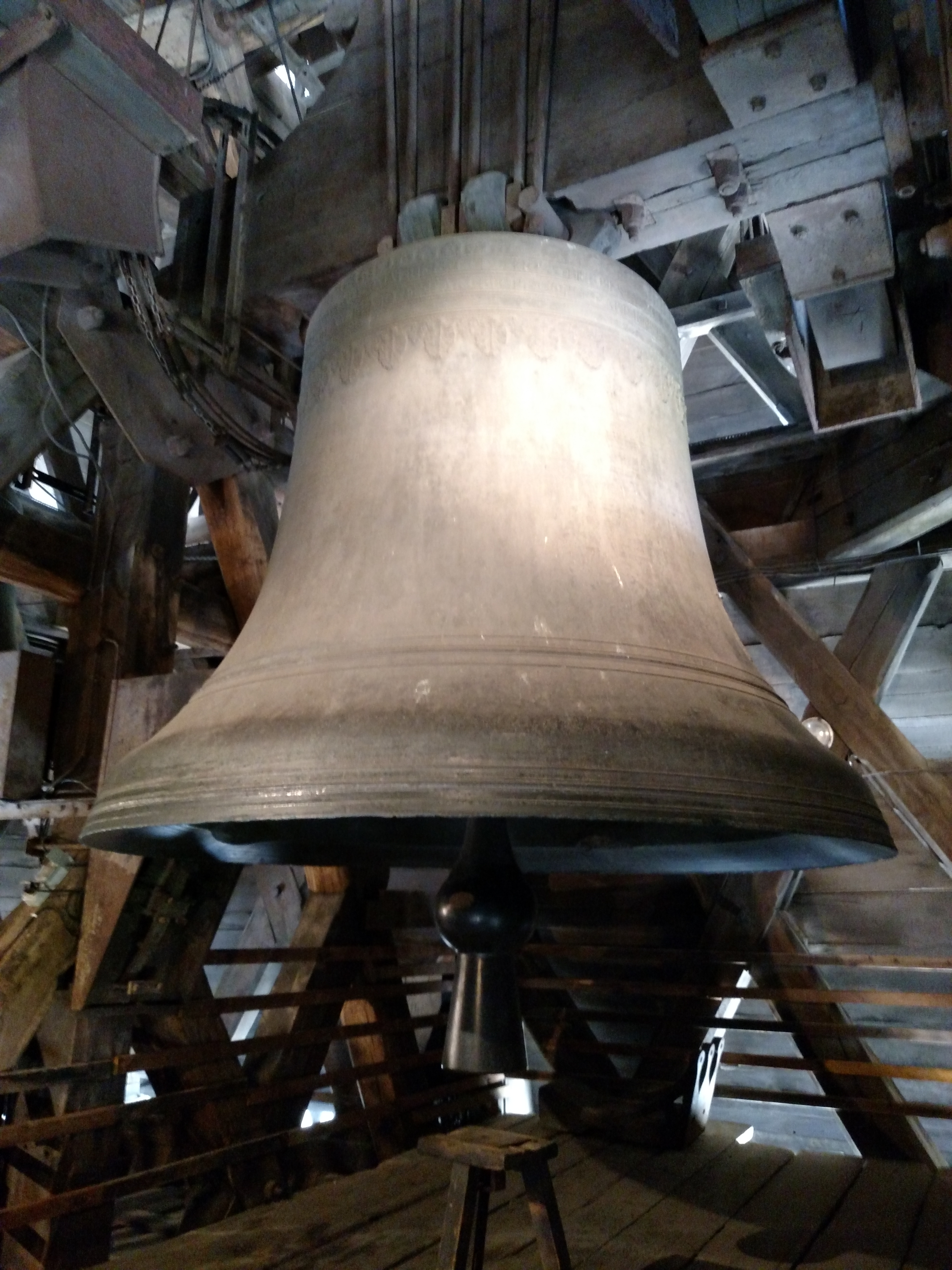
The bourdon Emmanuel, Notre-Dame's largest and oldest bell, cast in 1686

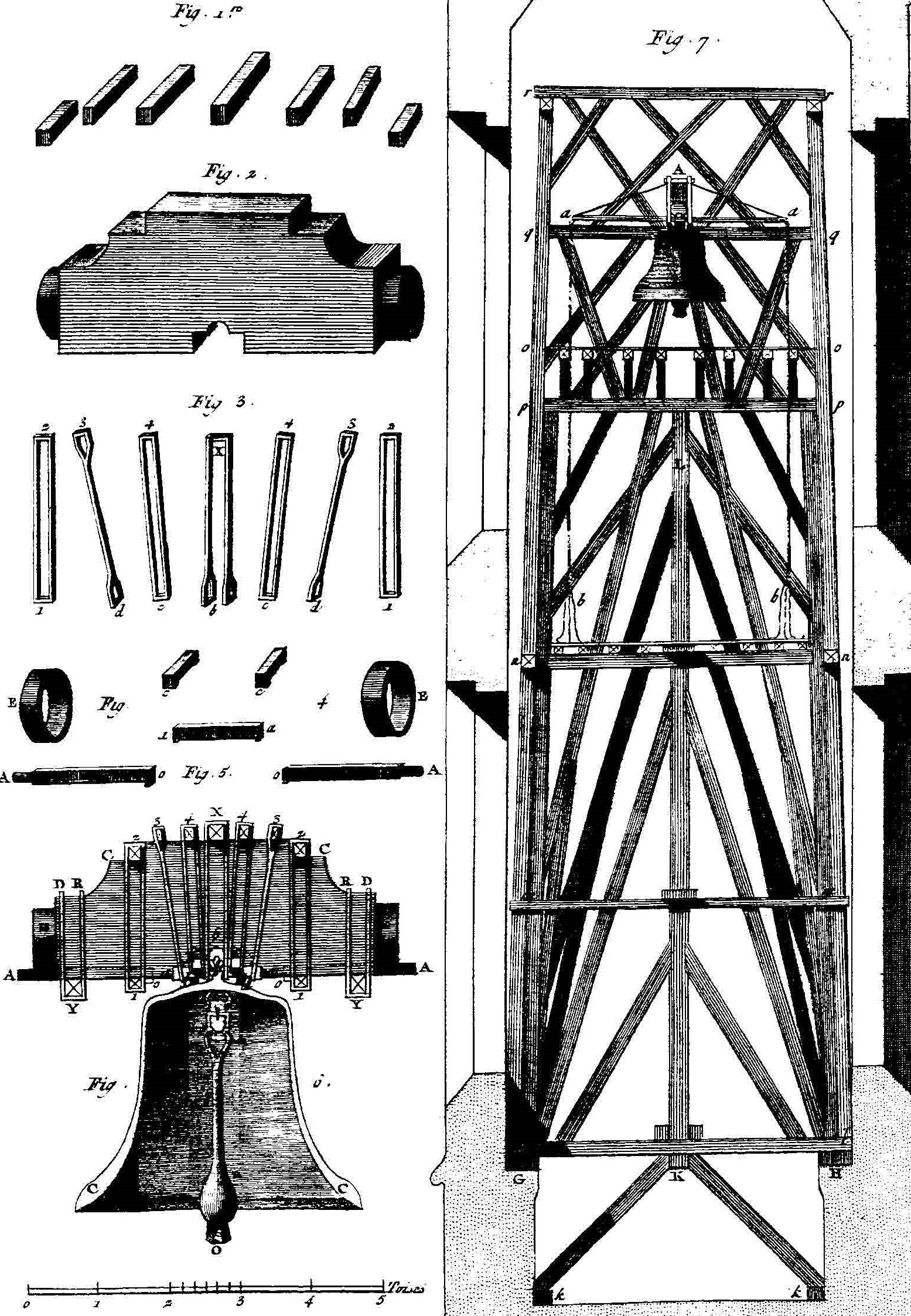
1767 illustration of a bell headstock and mounting components (left) and Notre-Dame's original south belfry (right) (Note: Notre-Dame's belfry was used as the model for this diagram. The stonework, however, was not drawn to be accurate. See Billon 1821, p. 148 and Doré 2012, p. 203.)

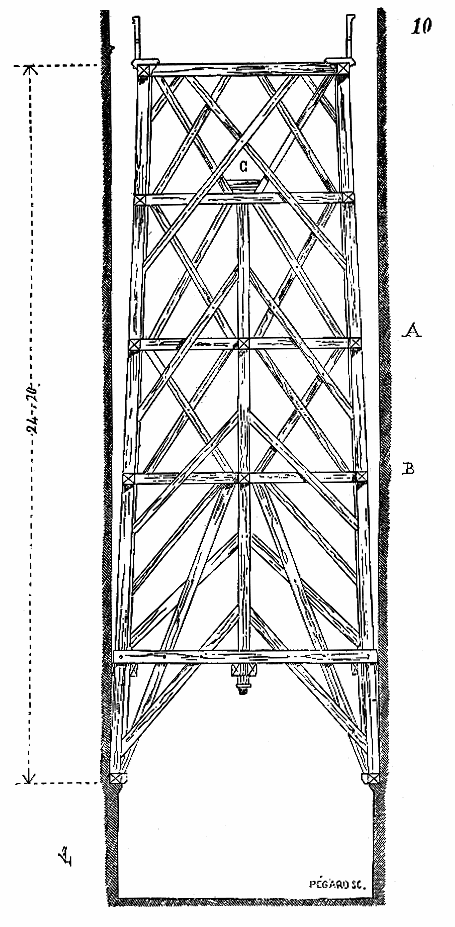
1854 illustration by Pégard showing the 1850 belfry which is present today

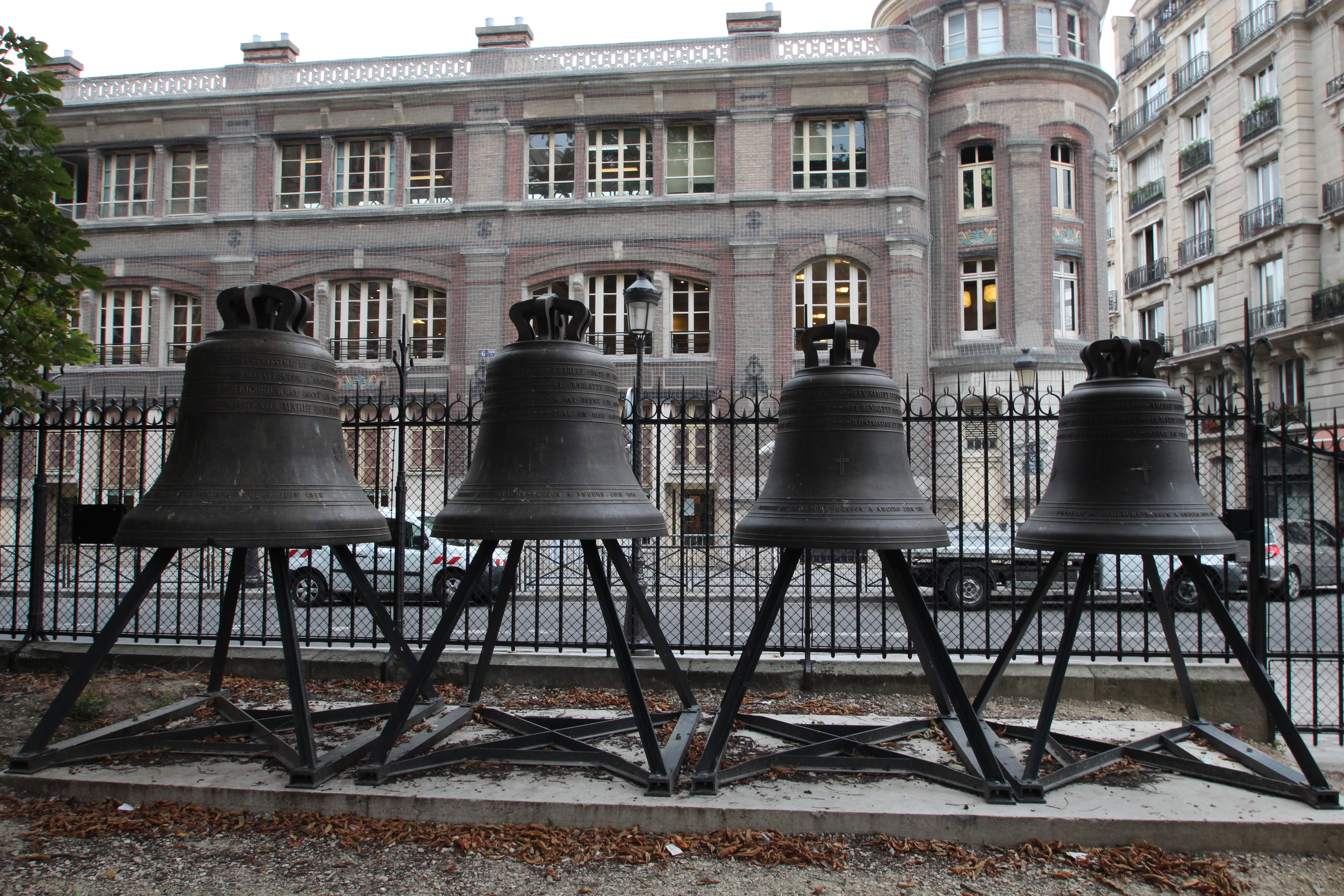
The four 19th-century bells which were retired in 2012

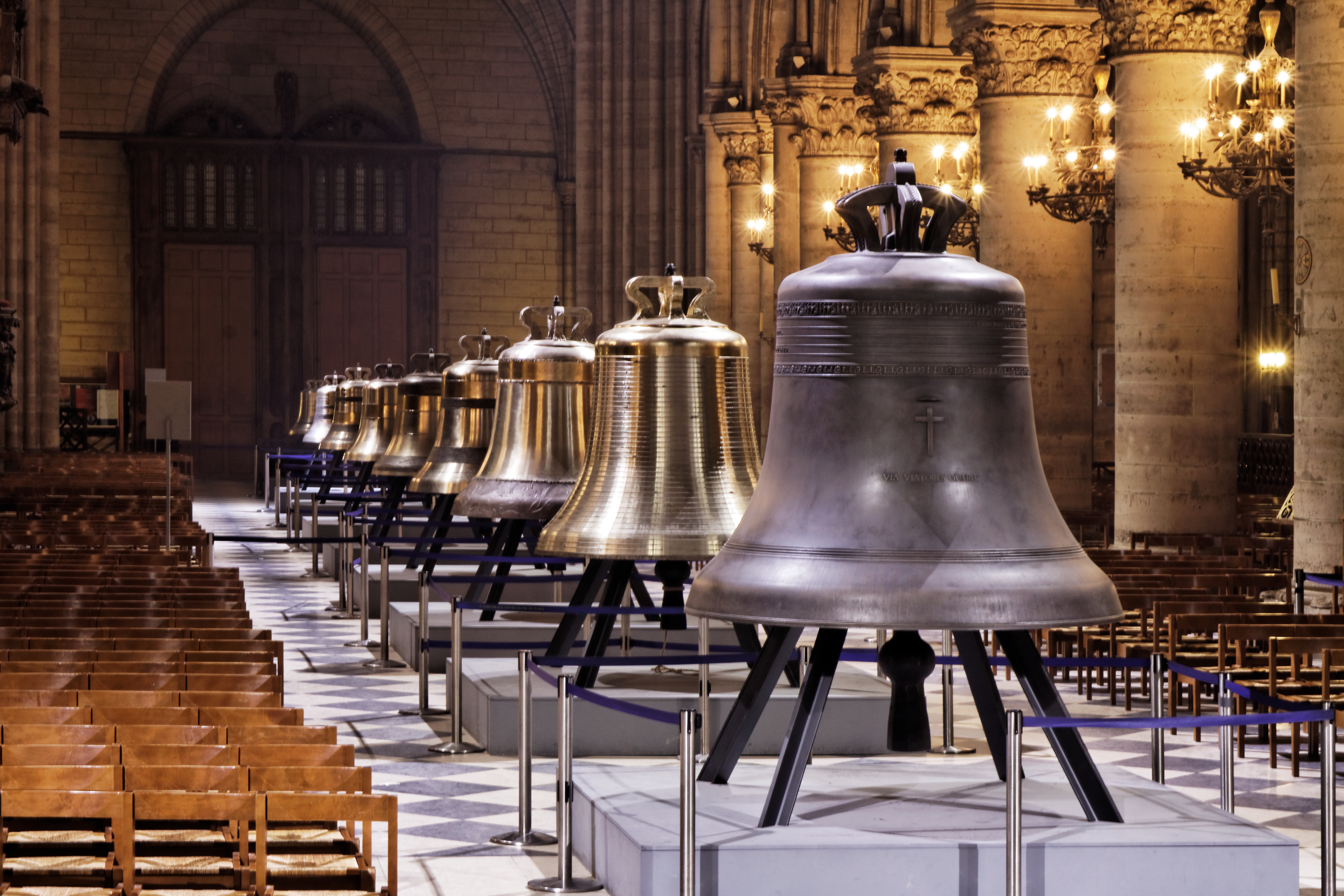
Nine new bells exhibited in the nave in February 2013

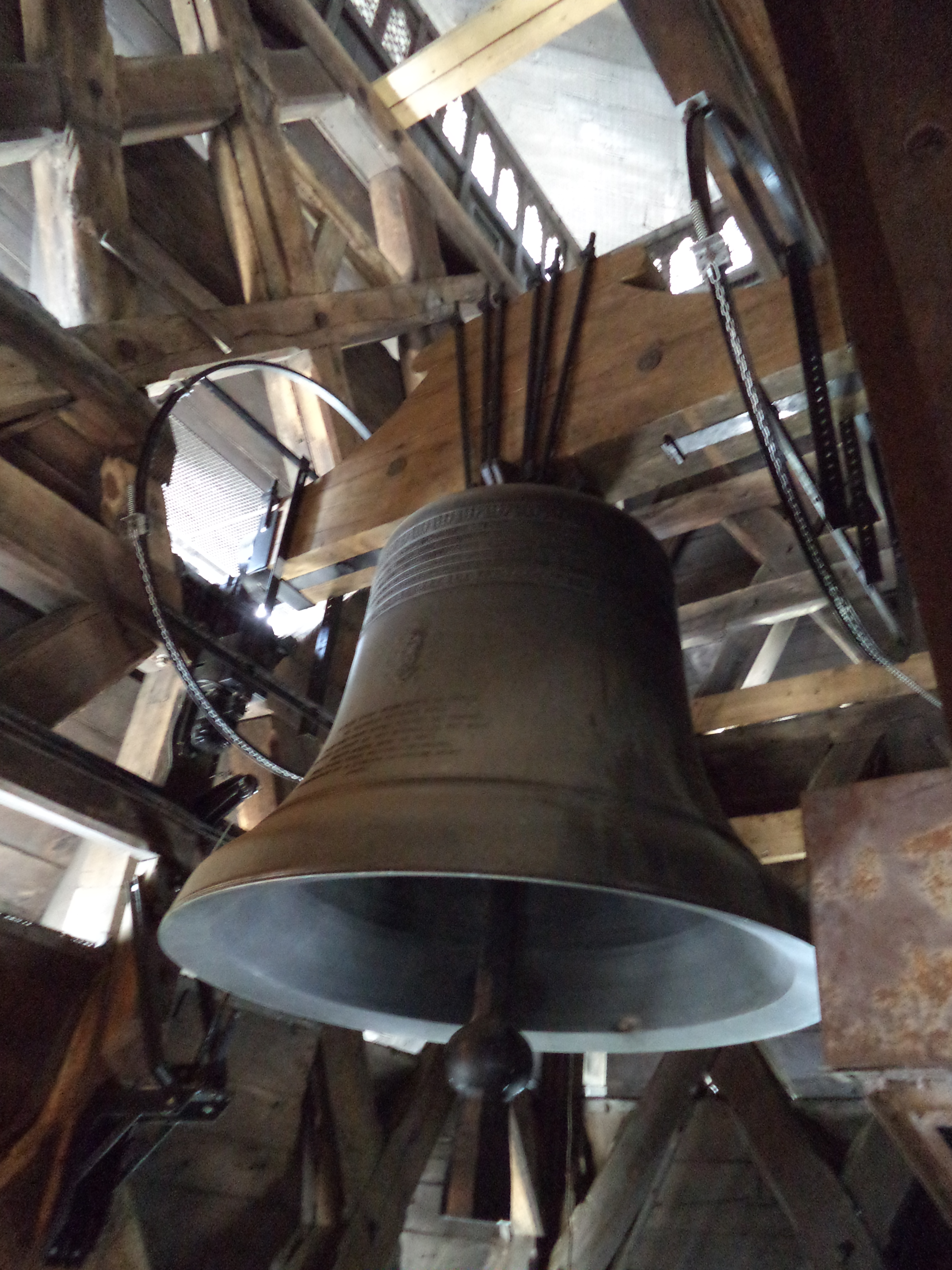
The second bourdon Marie mounted in the south belfry

== Clock ==
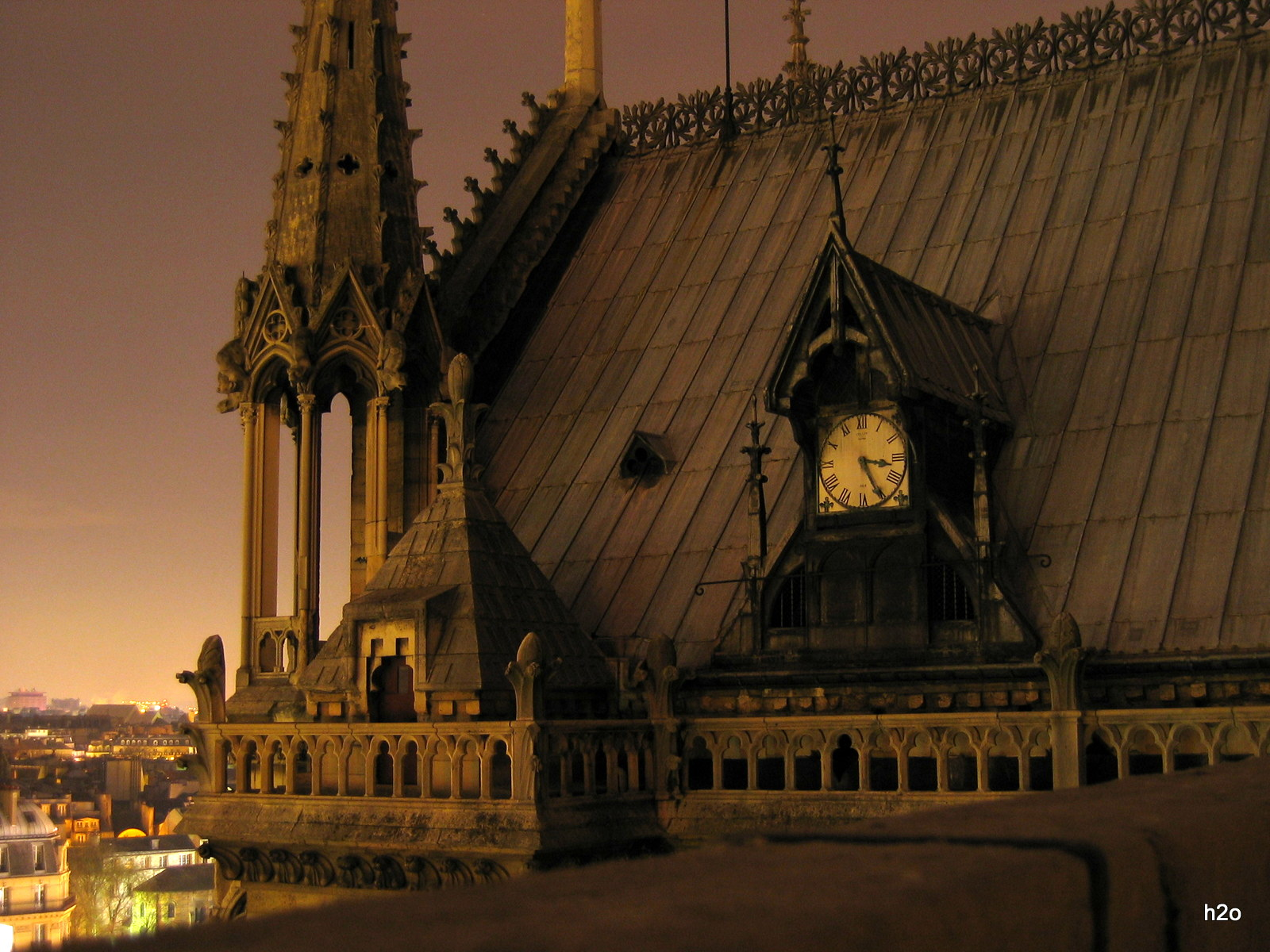
One of four clock faces of Notre-Dame's 19th-century clock (right). Chimes for the 18th-century clock were once held in a north transept turret, similar to the one pictured left on the south transept.

The first clocks used at Notre-Dame were clepsydras. These were used to tell the hours, which were marked by striking bells. In the 14th century Notre-Dame had two clepsydras running simultaneously, one in the cloister and one in the church itself. A lay chamberlain was responsible for keeping the clocks filled with water and to notify a churchwarden when it was time to strike the bells for the hour.

In 1766, Guillot de Montjoye and Jean-Bernard de Vienne, canons and stewards of the church fabric, donated a mechanical clock to the cathedral. The movement was installed in a glass cabinet in the gallery beneath the north rose window and rang three bells outside above the north portal. Between 1812 and 1813, the clock and bells were moved to the north tower. A 1.34-metre (4.4 ft) clock face was installed inside the church below the organ platform.

During Viollet-le-Duc's restoration in the 19th century, a new clock was made. The 1867 Collin-Wagner movement, measuring two metres (6.6 ft) across, was located in the forest underneath the central flèche within a glass-enclosed room. This controlled four dormer clock faces visible on the transept roofs, two on each side. This clock was destroyed by the 2019 fire. Shortly after the fire, French clockmaker Jean-Baptiste Vior discovered an almost identical 1867 Collin-Wagner movement in storage at Sainte-Trinité Church in northern Paris. Olivier Chandez, who had been responsible for the upkeep of Notre-Dame's clock, described the find as "almost a miracle." The clock cannot be installed in Notre-Dame, but it was hoped that the clock could be used to create a new clock for Notre-Dame to the same specifications as the one which was destroyed.

== Ownership ==
Until the French Revolution, Notre-Dame was the property of the archbishop of Paris and therefore the Catholic Church. It was nationalized on 2 November 1789 and since then has been the property of the French state. Under the Concordat of 1801, use of the cathedral was returned to the Church, but not ownership. Legislation from 1833 and 1838 clarified that cathedrals were maintained at the expense of the French government. This was reaffirmed in the 1905 law on the separation of Church and State, designating the Catholic Church as having the exclusive right to use it for religious purposes in perpetuity. Notre-Dame is one of seventy historic churches in France with this status. The archdiocese is responsible for paying the employees, for security, heating and cleaning, and for ensuring that the cathedral is open free of charge to visitors. The archdiocese does not receive subsidies from the French state.

== Gallery ==
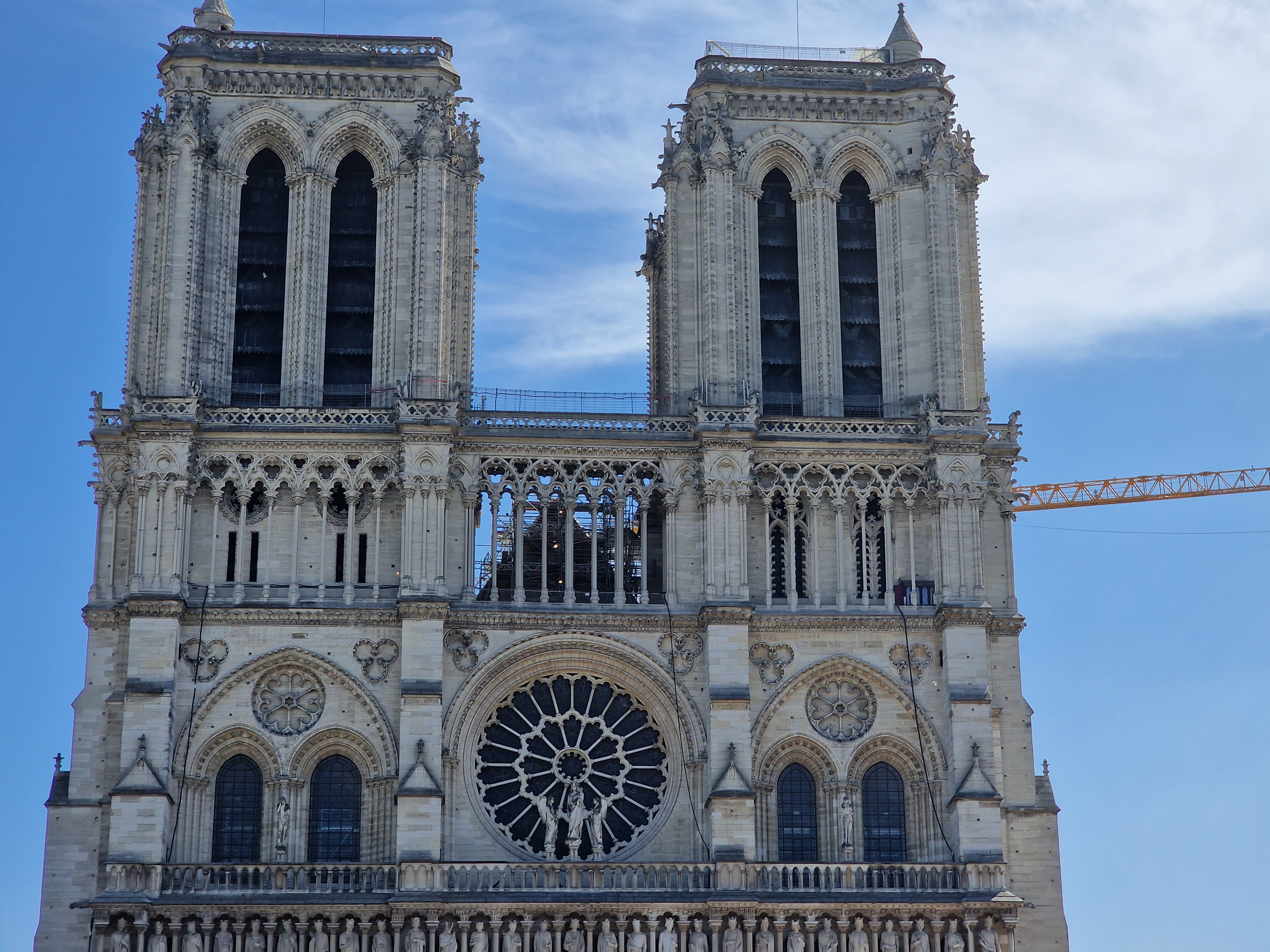
During reconstruction following the fire

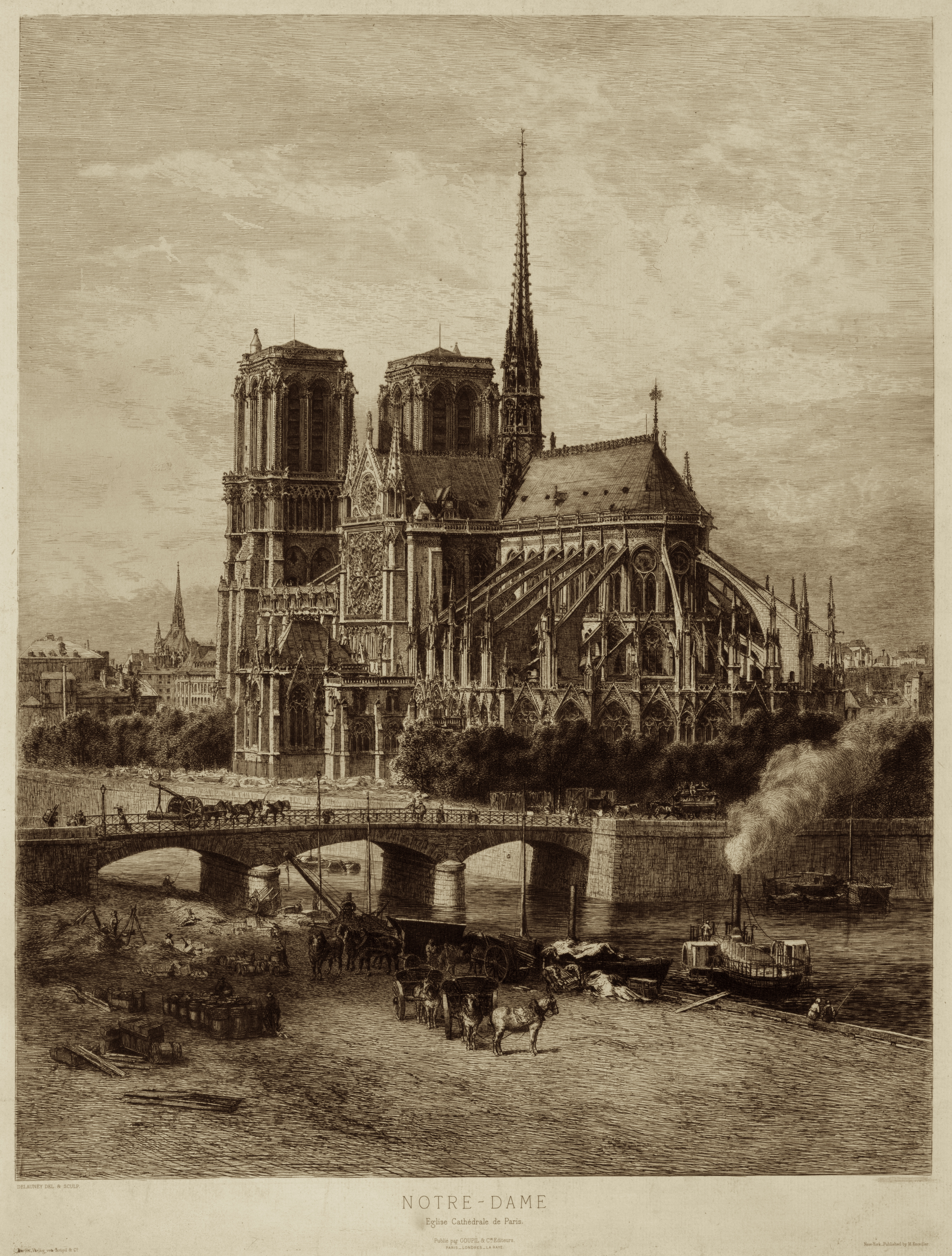
Notre-Dame at the end of the 19th century

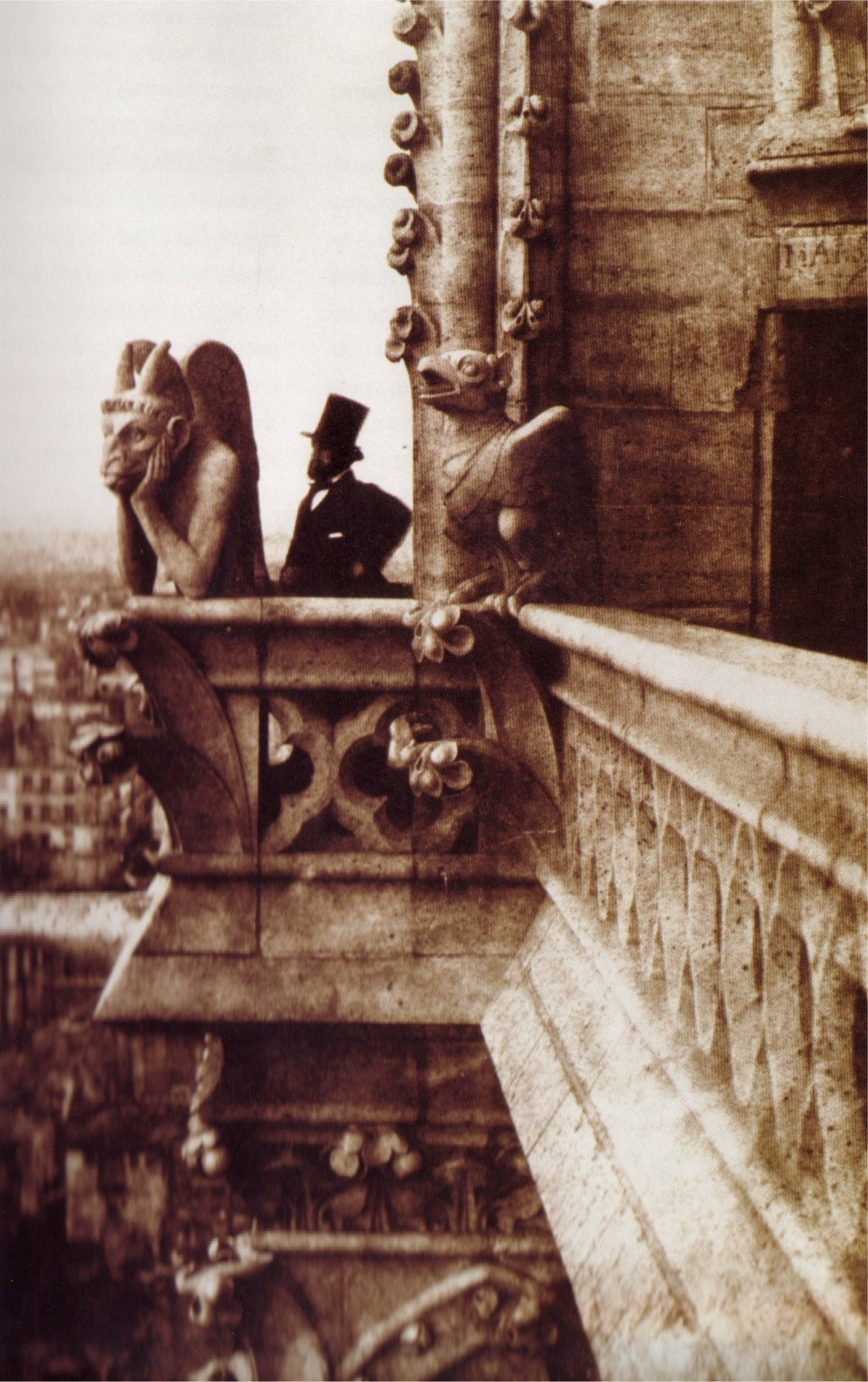
An 1853 photo by Charles Nègre of Henri Le Secq next to Le Stryge

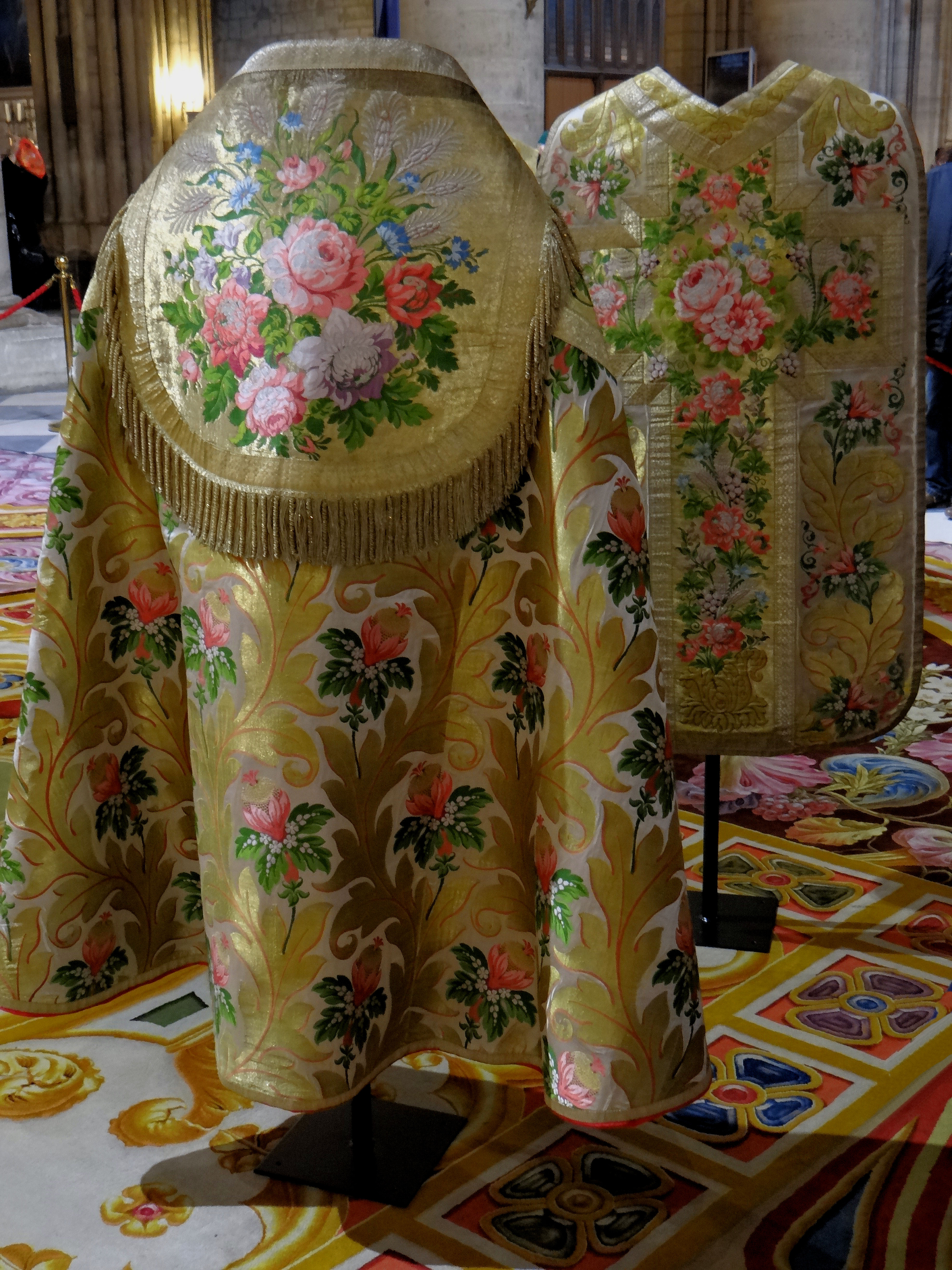
19th-century vestments

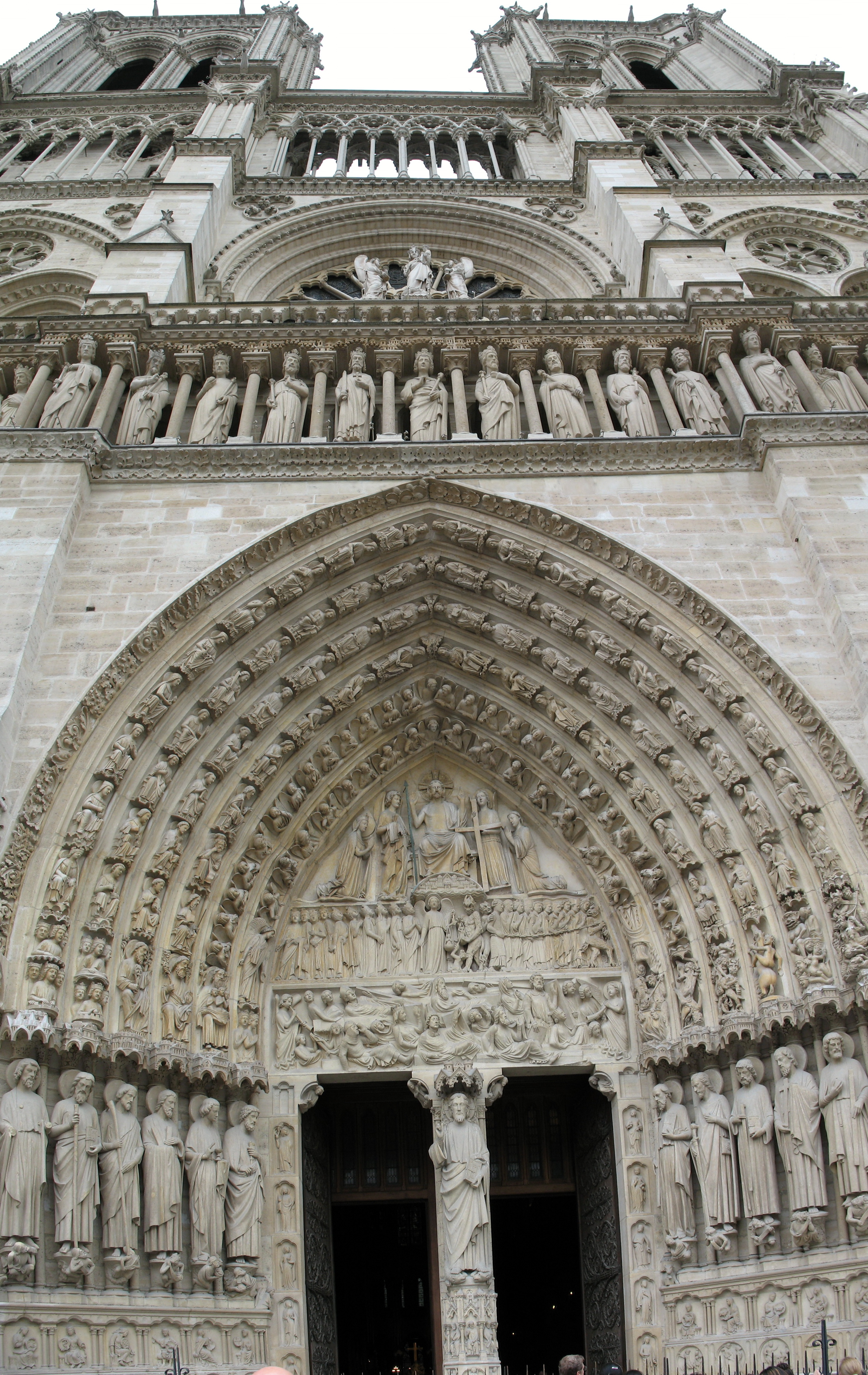
A wide angle view of Notre-Dame's western façade

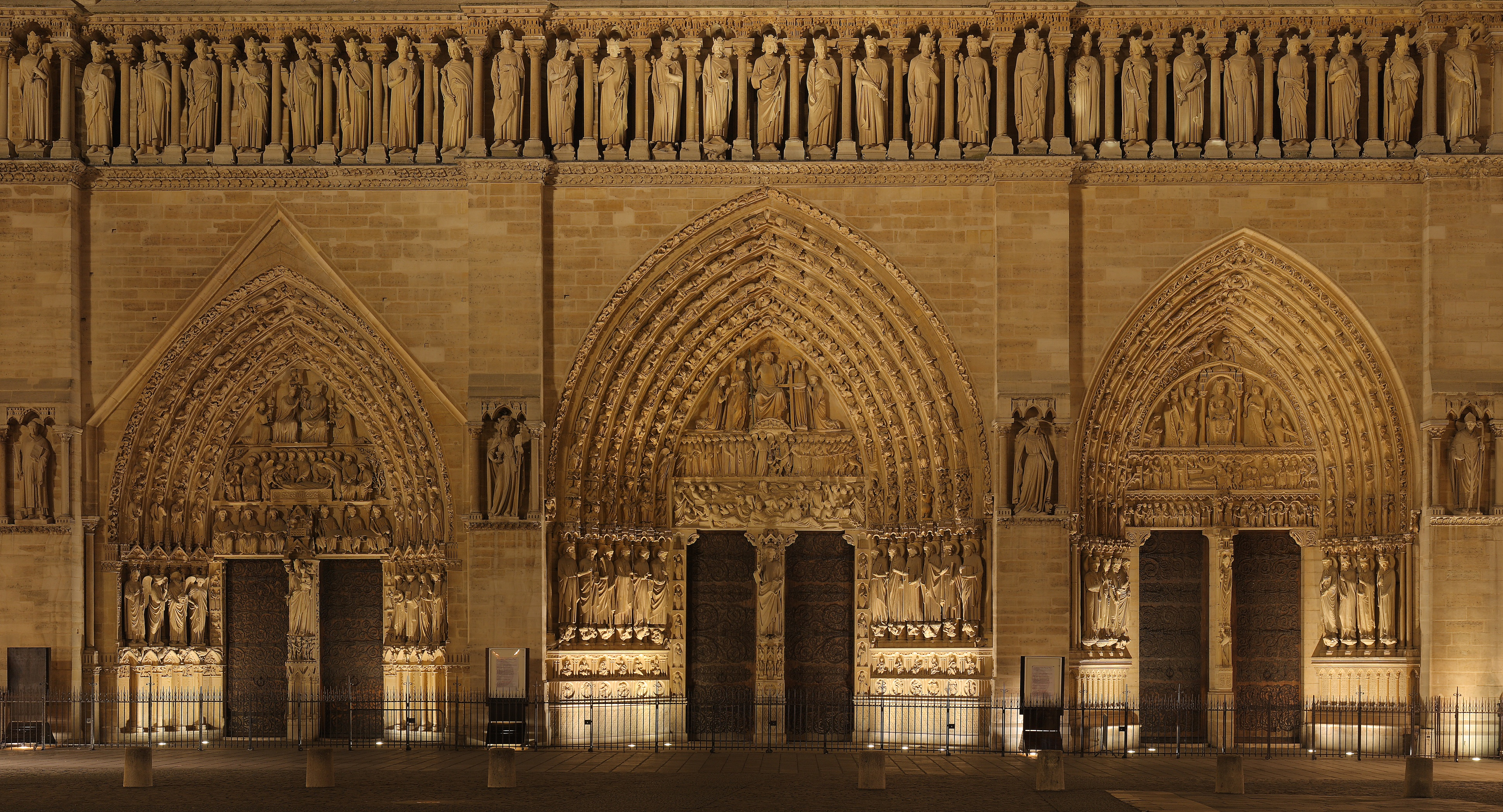
Notre-Dame's façade showing the Portal of the Virgin, Portal of the Last Judgment, and Portal of St-Anne

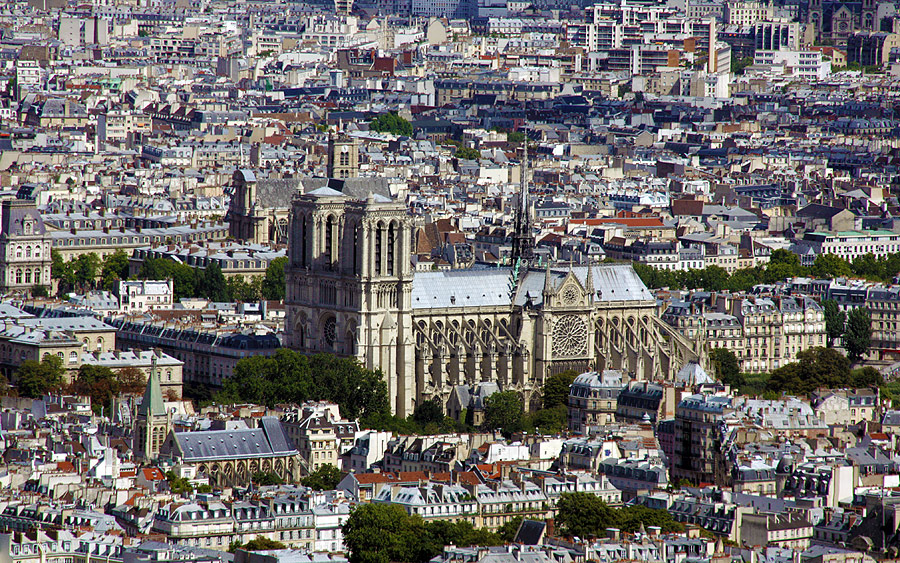
A 2010 view of Notre-Dame from Tour Montparnasse

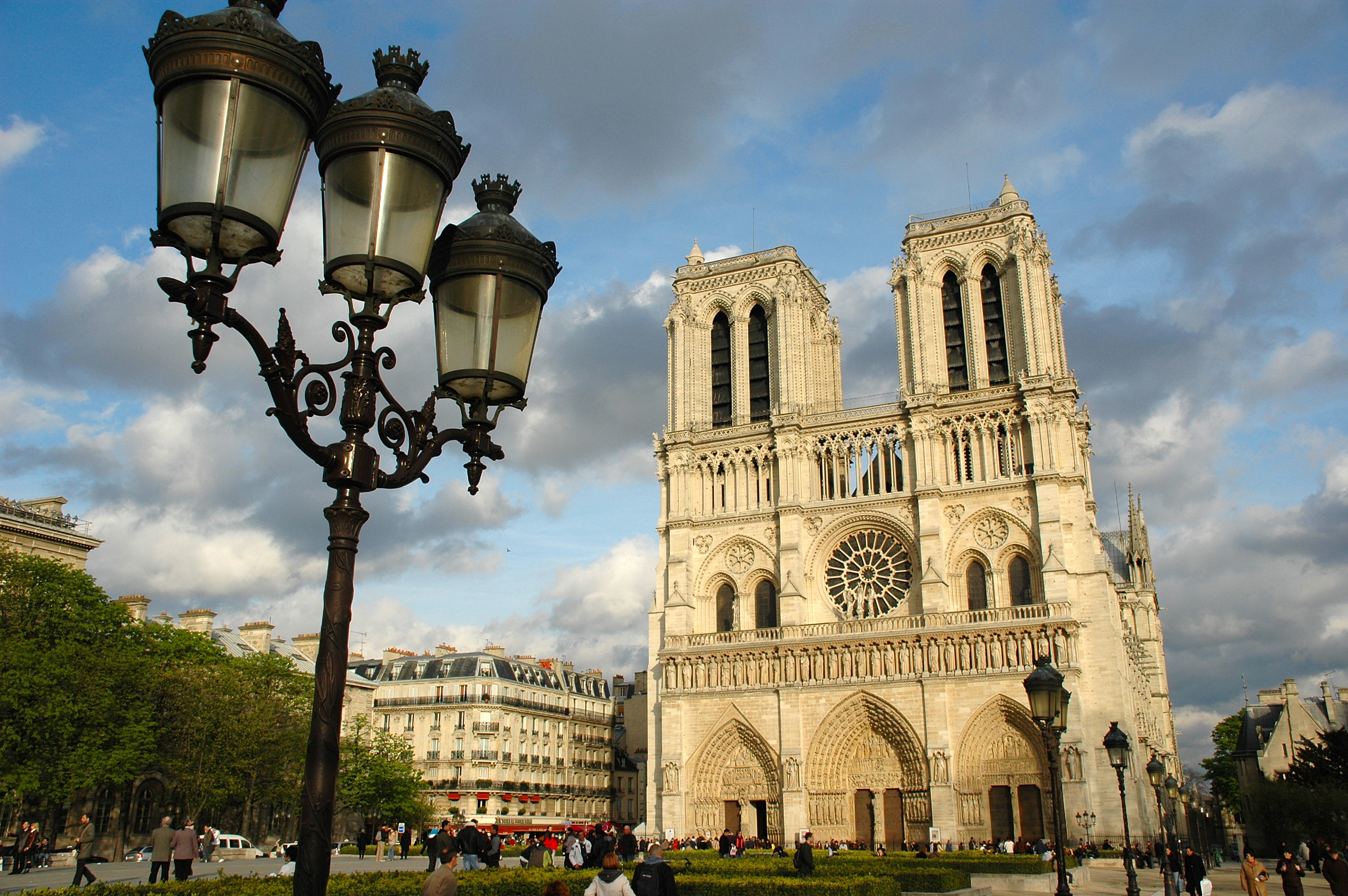
A wide angle view of Notre-Dame's western façade

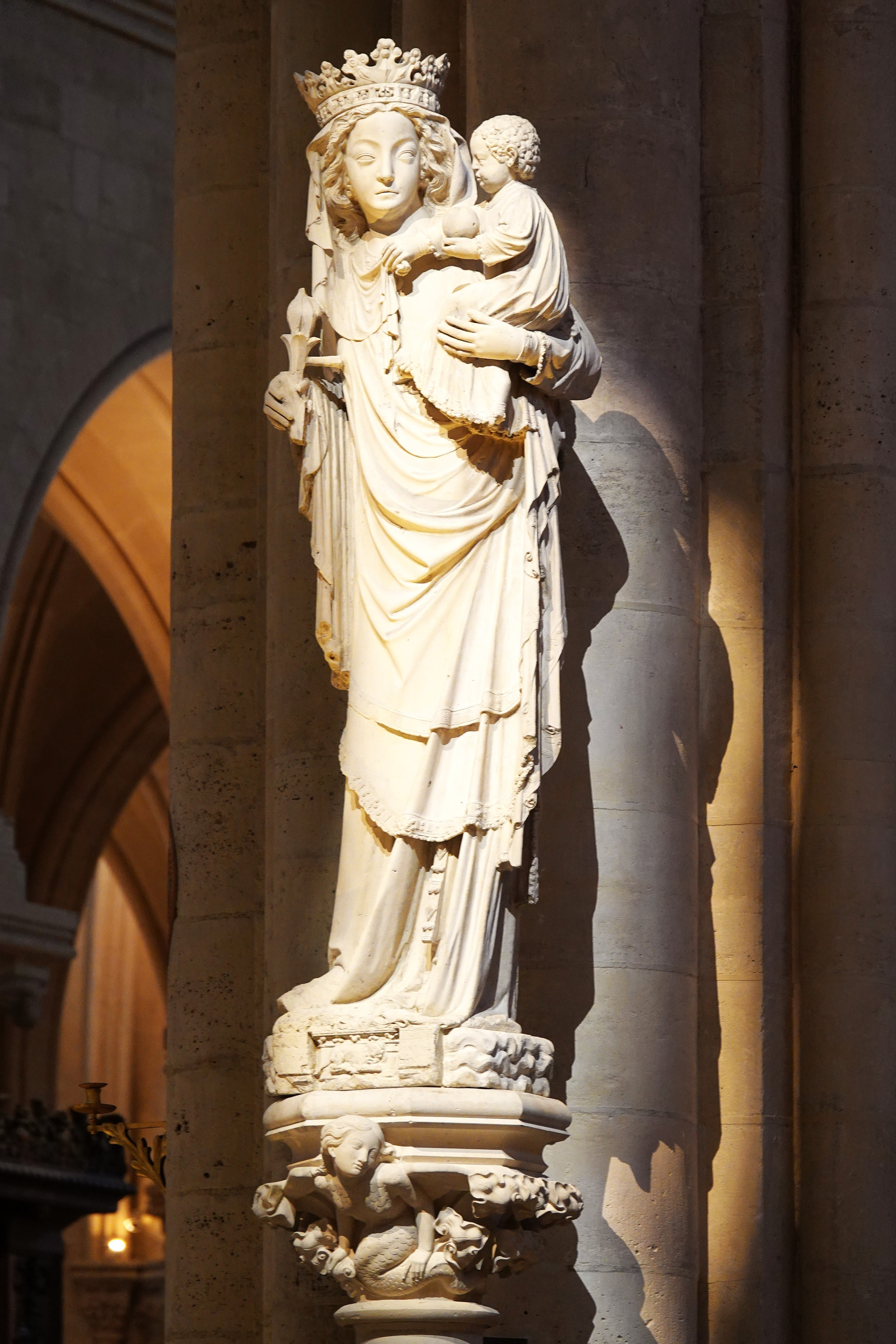
Virgin of the pillar, 14th century. The Statue of Virgin and Child inside Notre-Dame de Paris

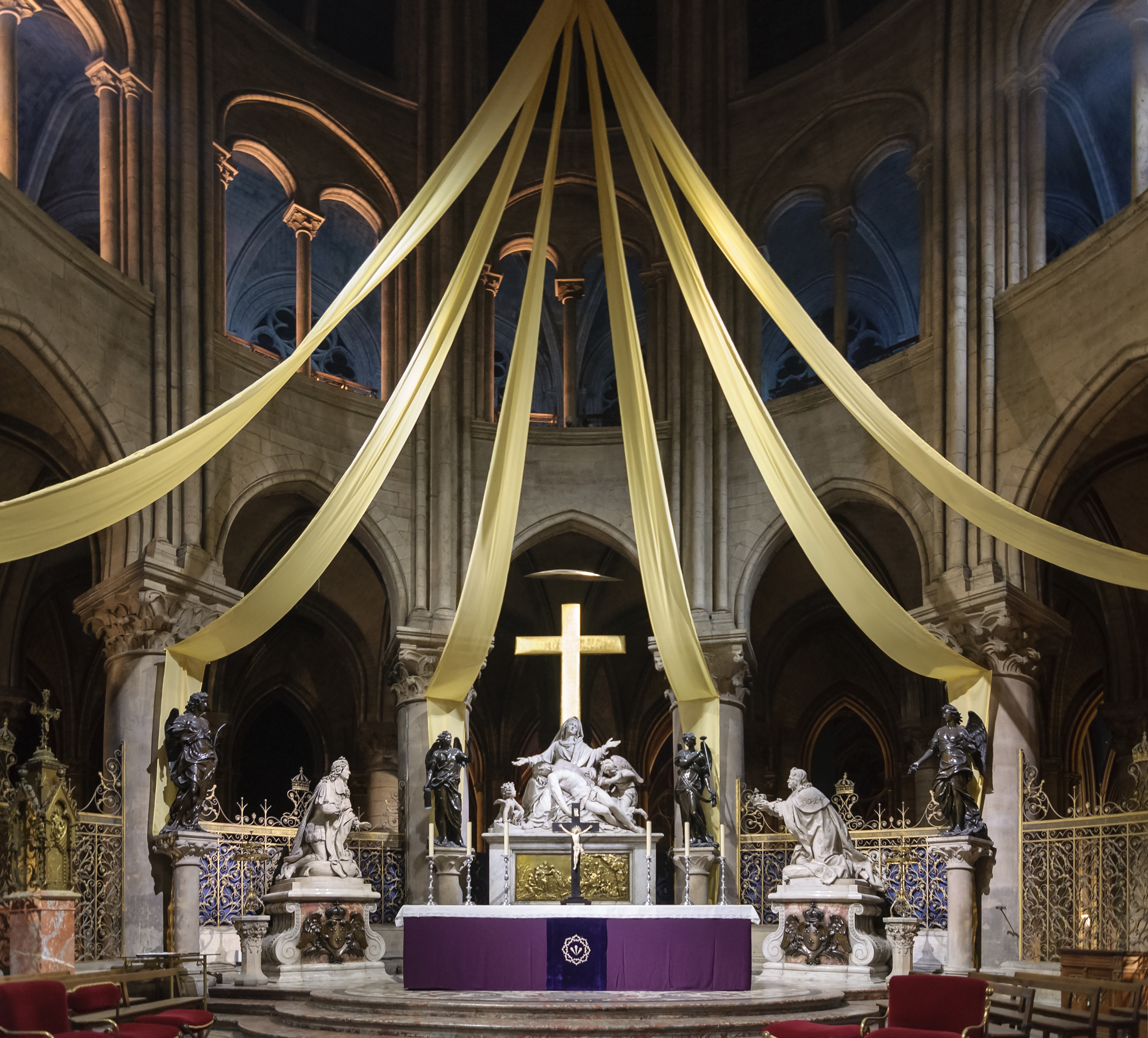
Notre-Dame's high altar with the kneeling statues of Louis XIII and Louis XIV

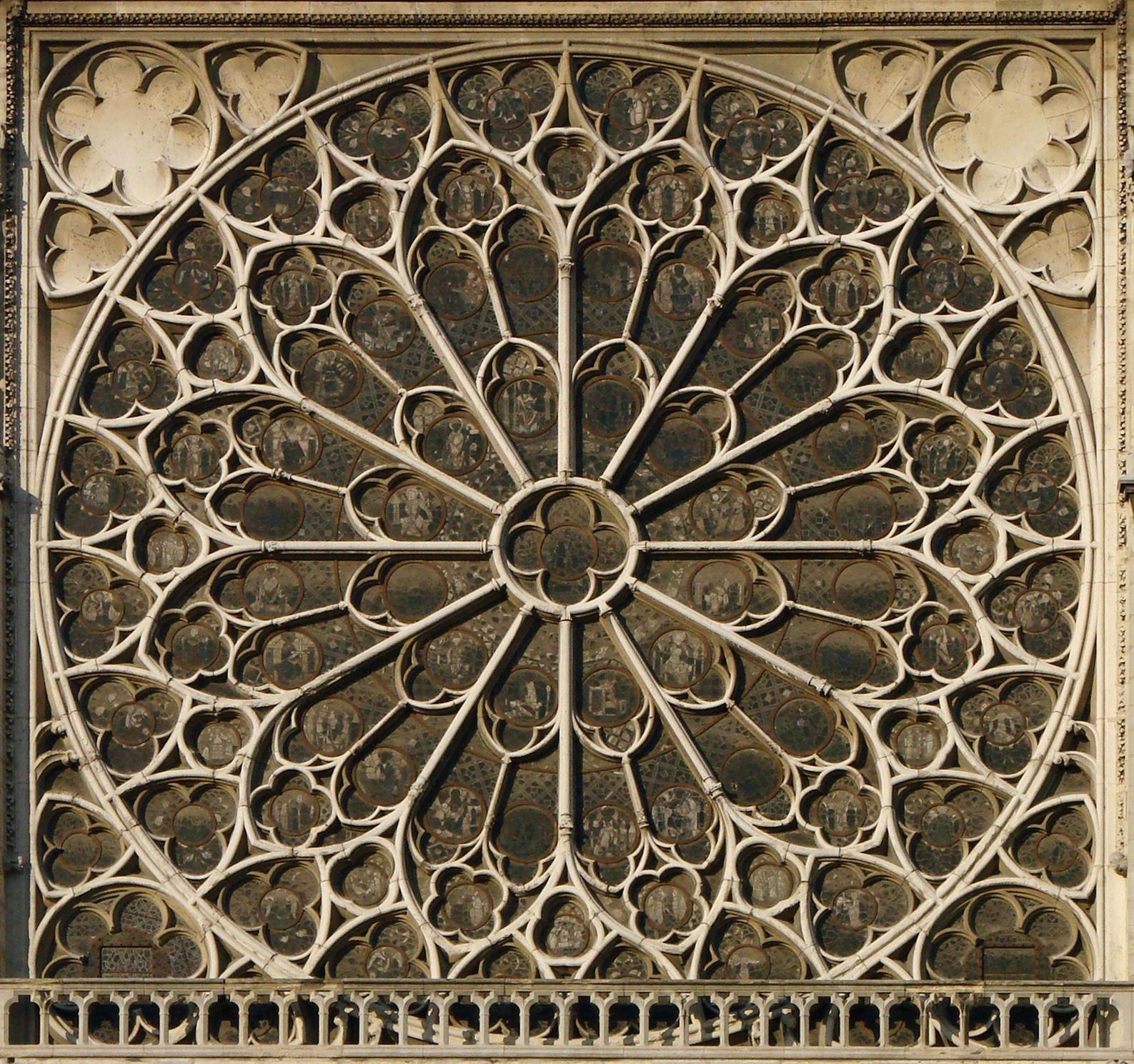
South rose window of Notre-Dame

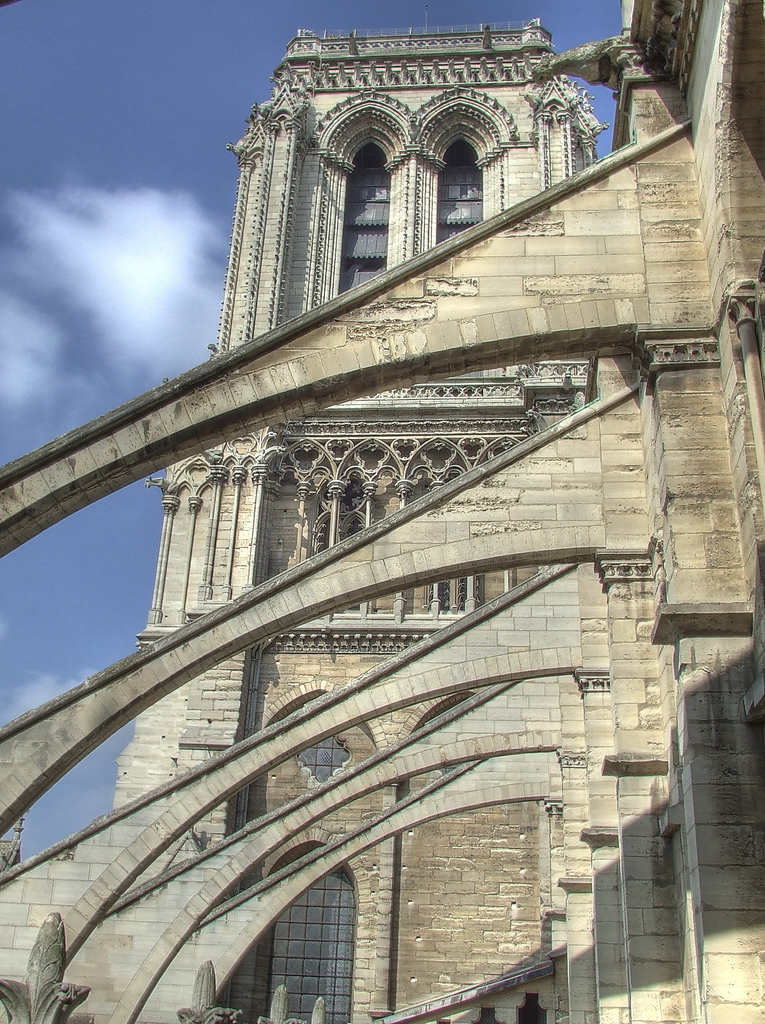
Flying buttresses of Notre-Dame

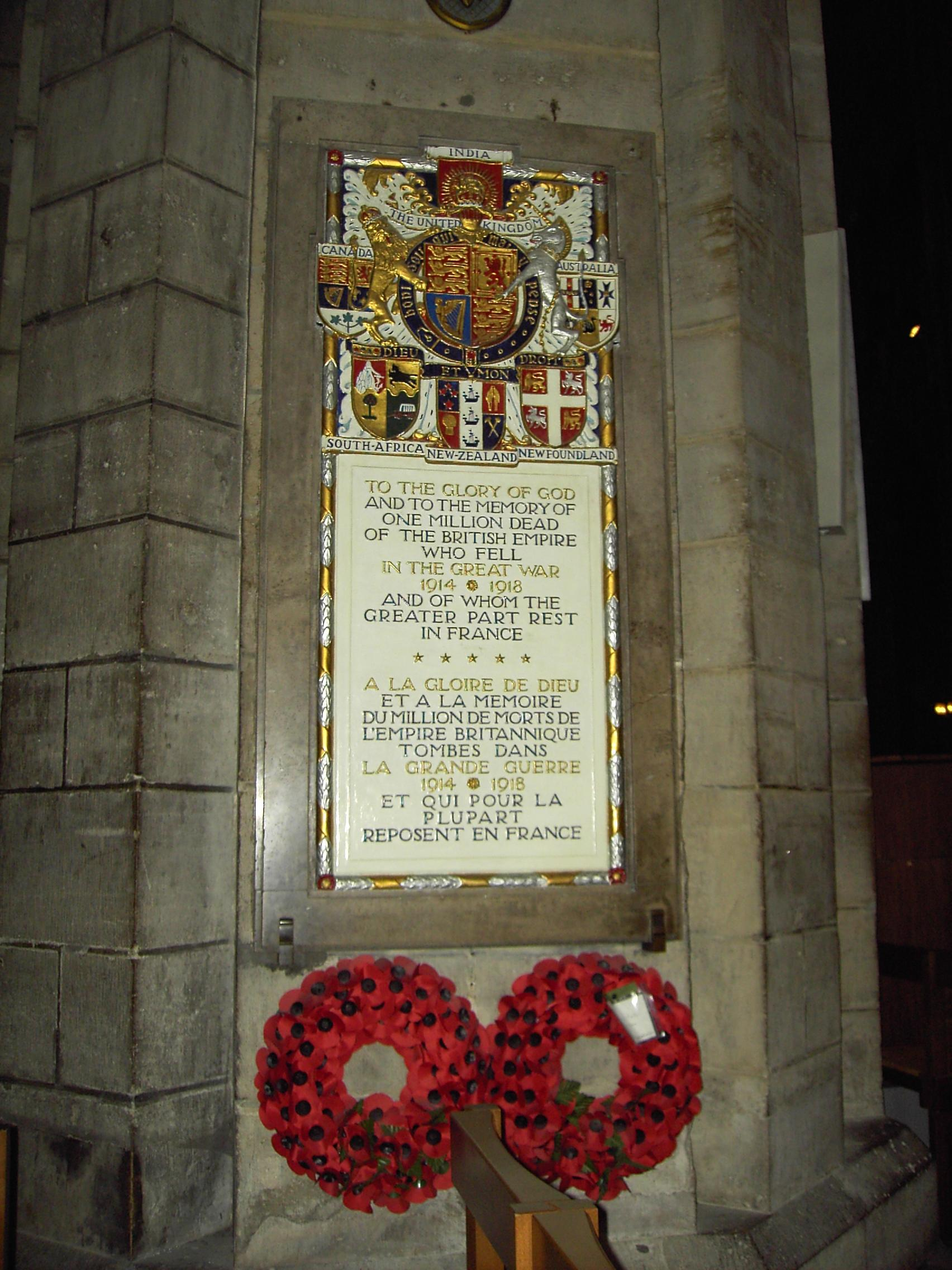
Memorial tablet to the British Empire dead of the First World War

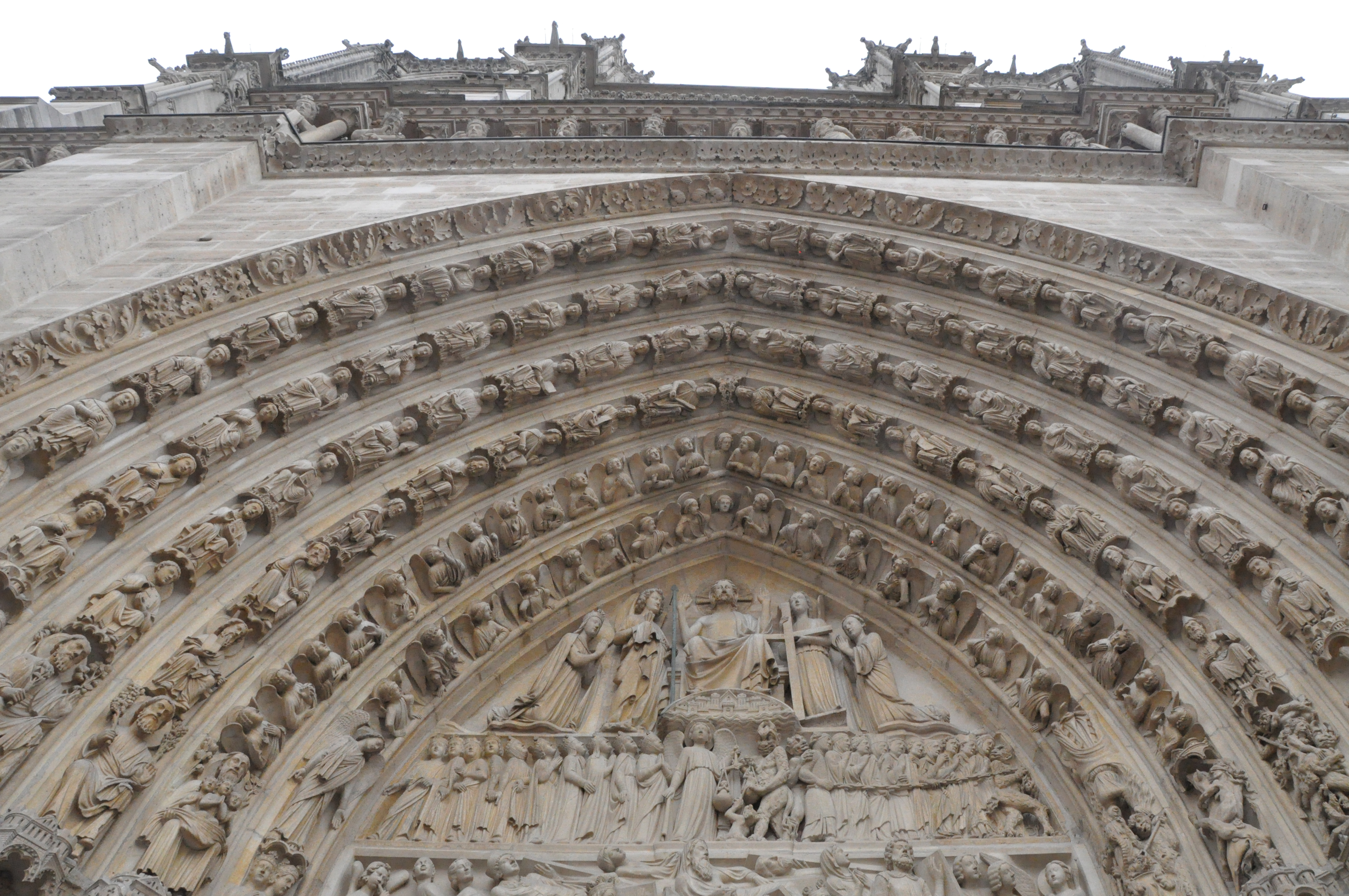
Tympanum of the Last Judgment

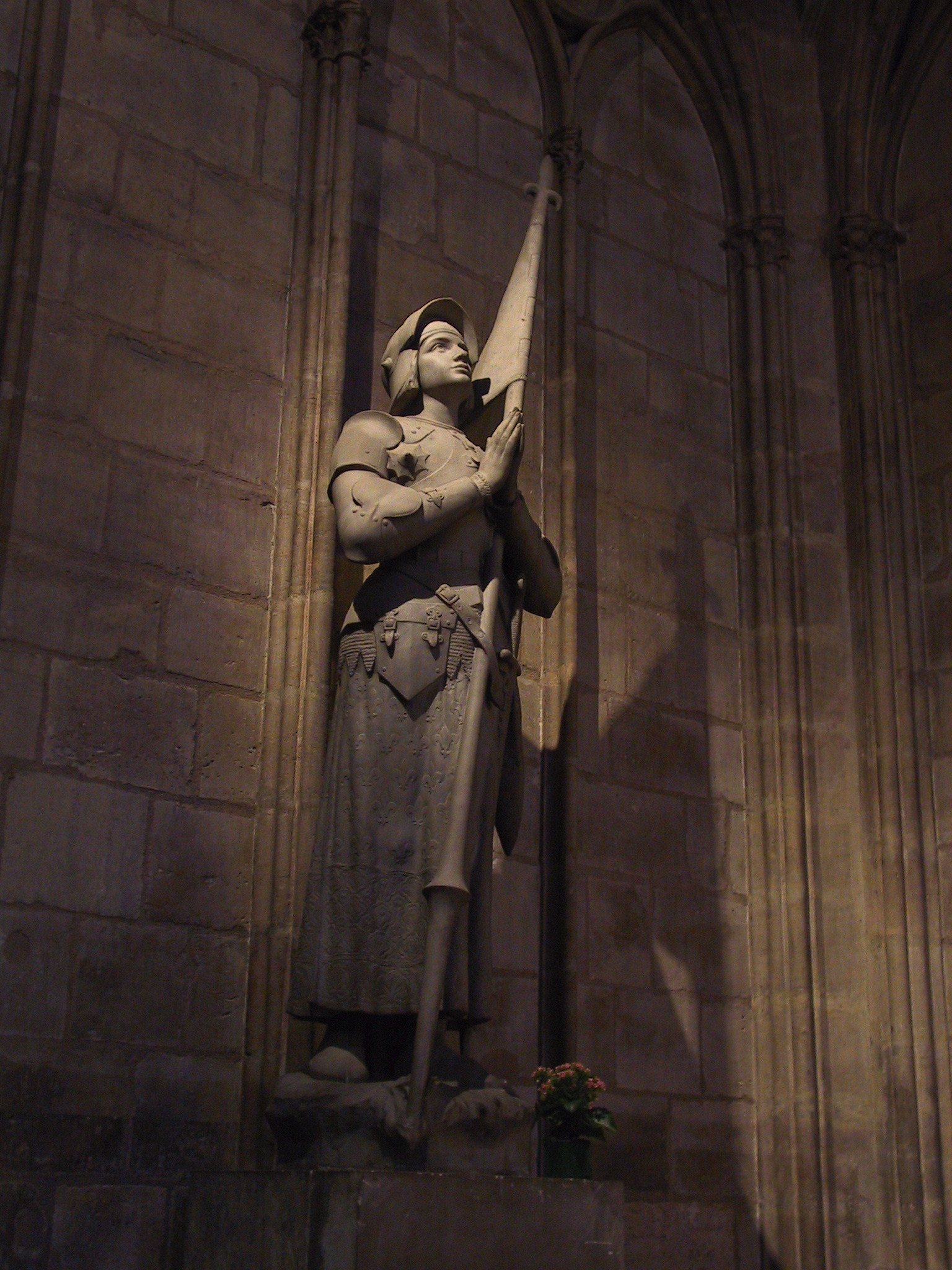
Statue of Joan of Arc in Notre-Dame's interior

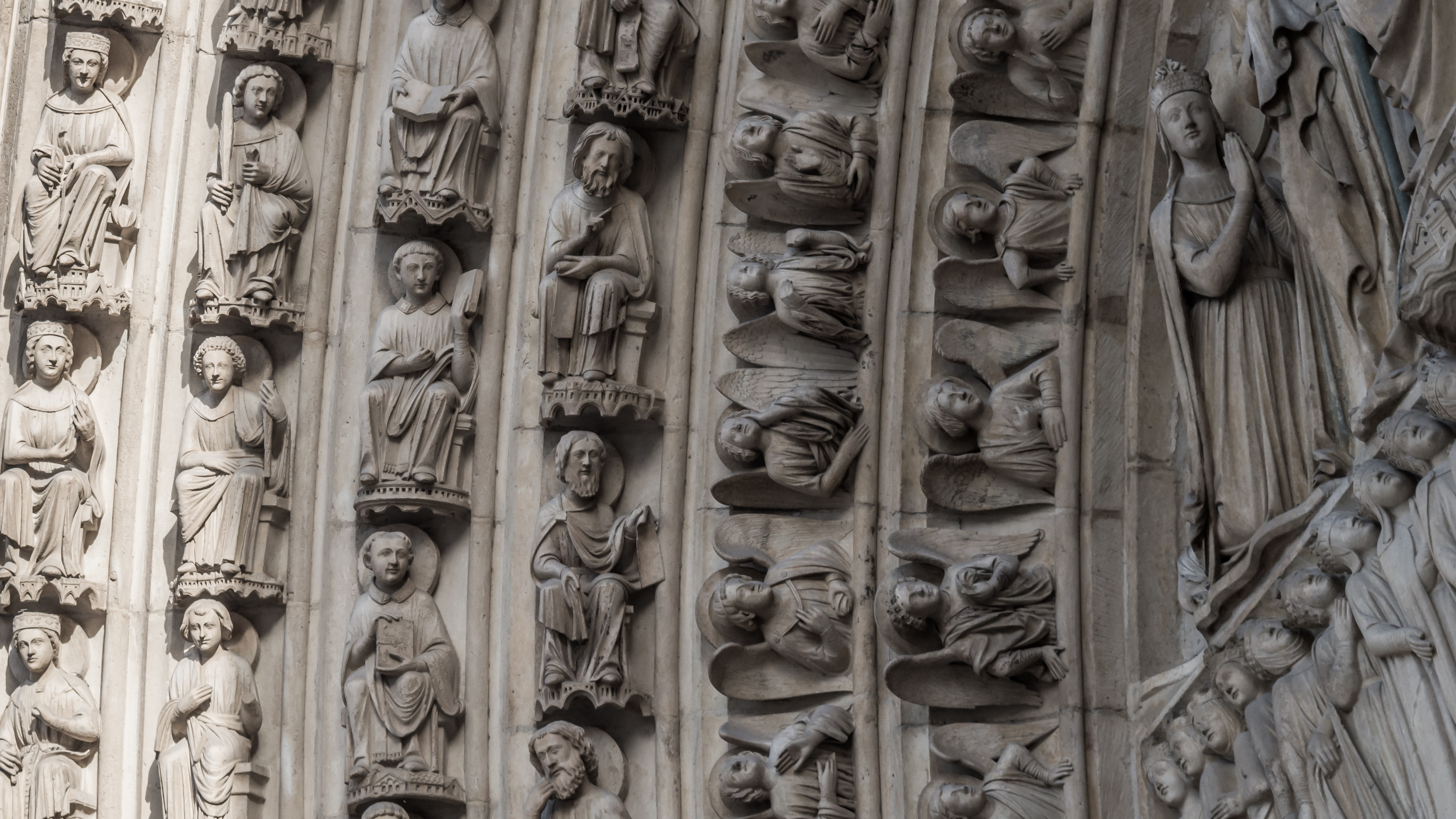
Close look of the details on the Tympanum of the Last Judgment (2016)

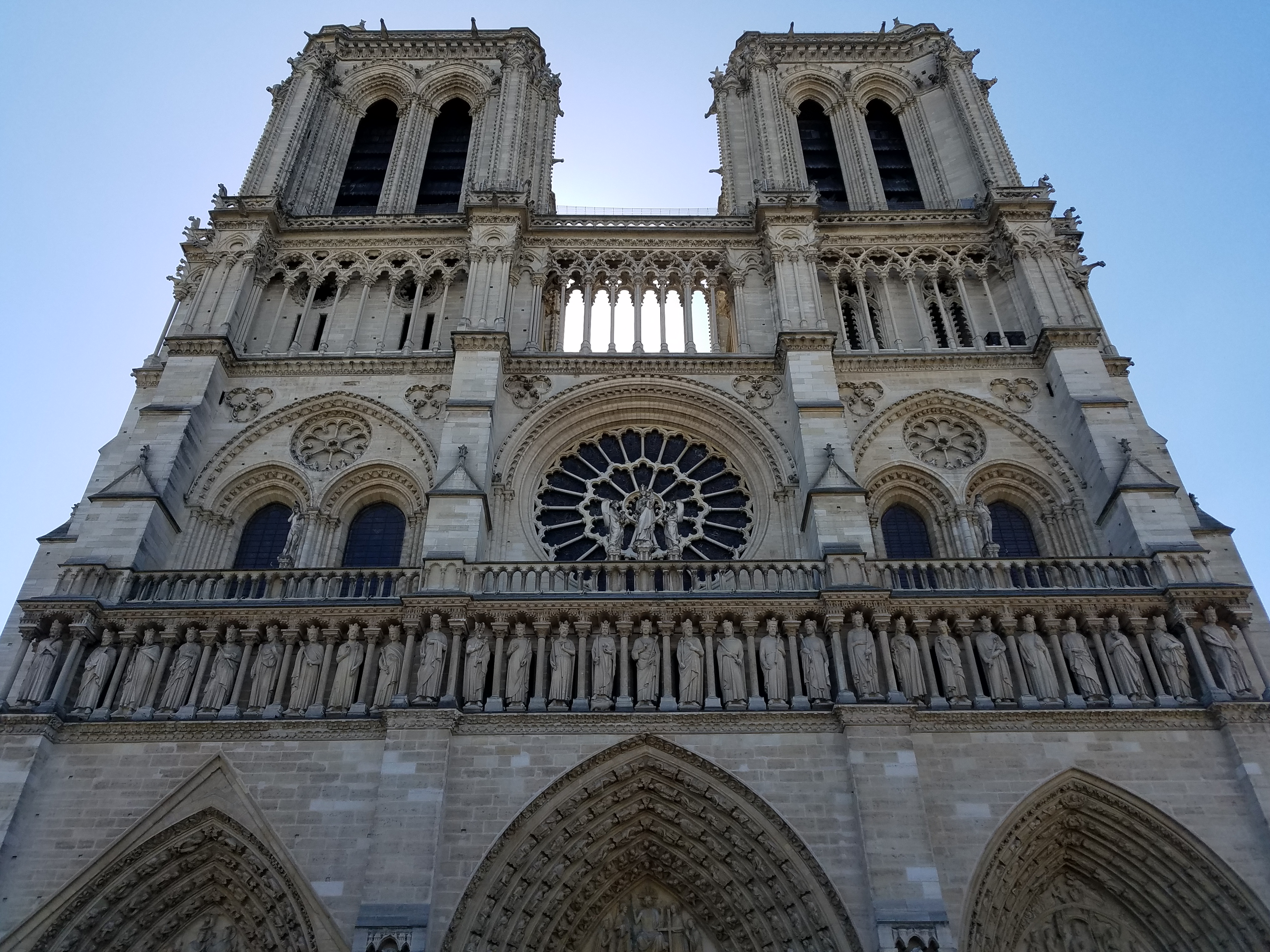
Façade of Notre-Dame

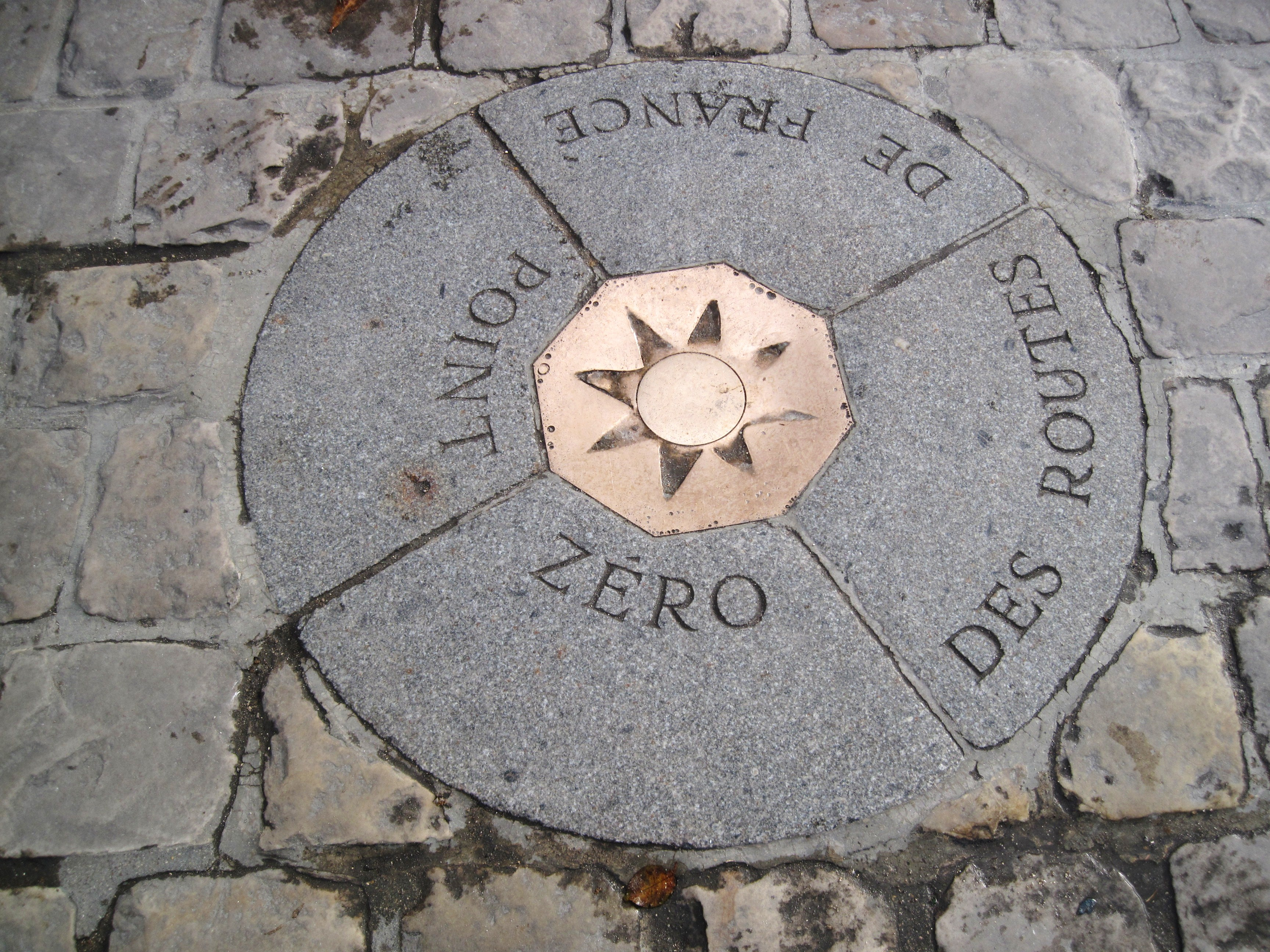
French road system's Point Zéro spot on the ground in front of Notre-Dame (since 1924)

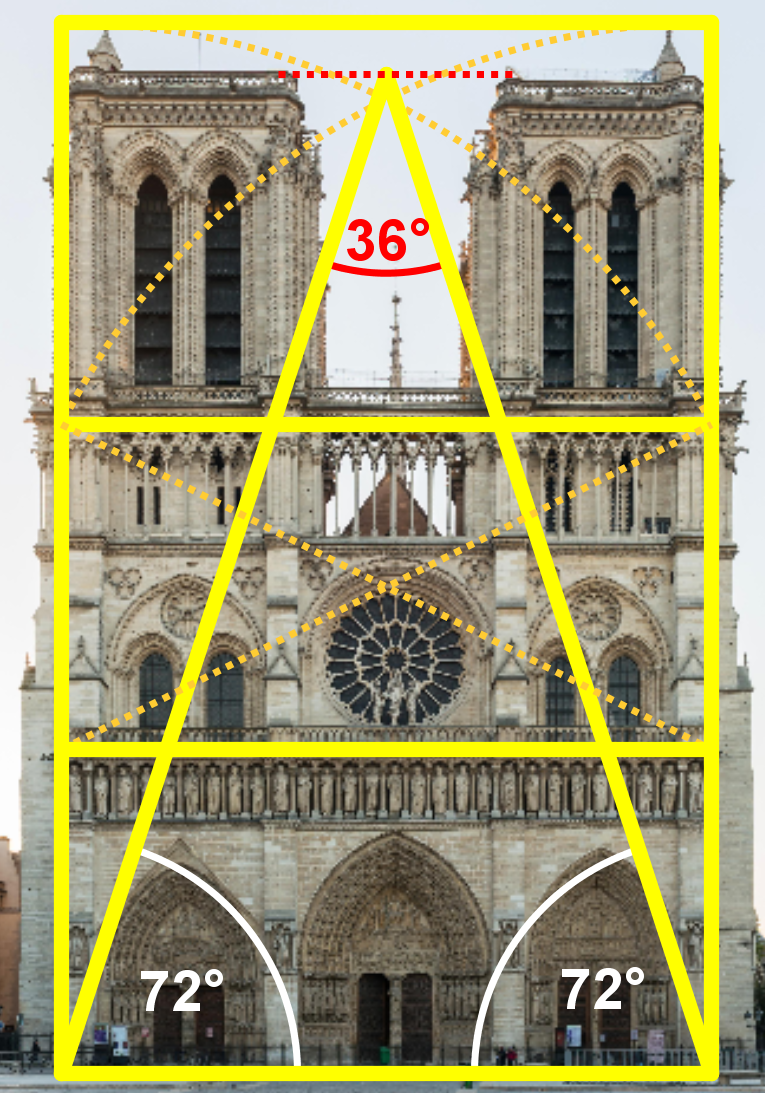
Characteristics of the Golden ratio

== See also ==
- Archbishop's Palace of Paris, destroyed 1831
- Architecture of Paris
- List of tourist attractions in Paris
- Gothic cathedrals and churches
- List of destroyed heritage
- List of Gothic cathedrals in Europe
- List of historic churches in Paris
- List of tallest buildings and structures in the Paris region
- Musée de Notre Dame de Paris
- Notre-Dame du Calvaire, Paris
- Catholic Marian church buildings
- Notre Dame de Roscudon Church
