= Rayonnant =

Architectural style of Medieval France

Rayonnant style
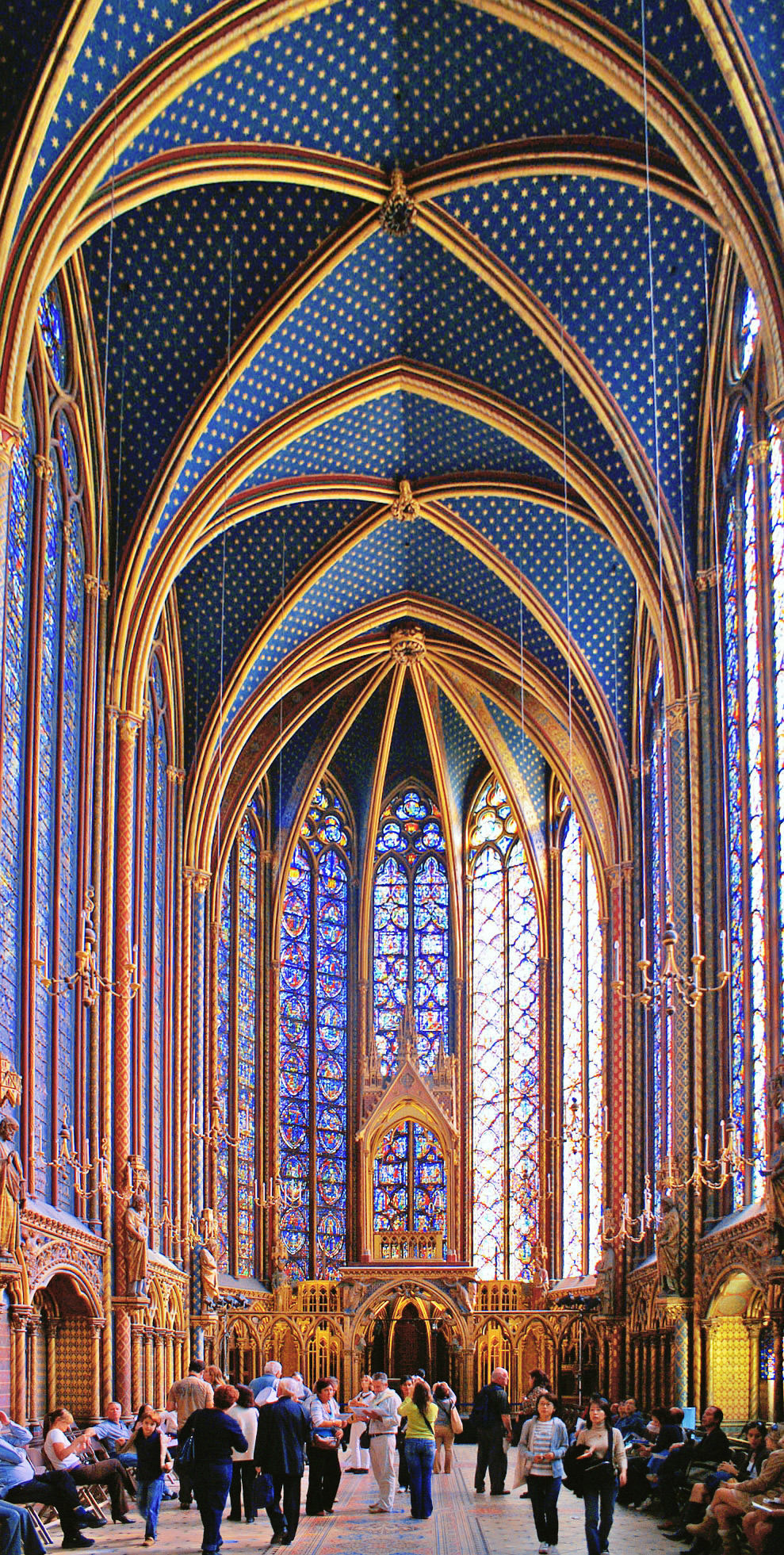
- Upper level of Sainte-Chapelle, Paris (about 1250)
- Years active: 1231 to mid-14th century
- Location: France
- Influences: High Gothic architecture
- Influenced: Decorated Gothic architecture; Flamboyant Gothic architecture

Rayonnant was a style of Gothic Architecture which was developed in France in the 13th century. It was the defining style of the High Gothic period, and is often described as the high point of French Gothic architecture. French architects turned their attention from building cathedrals of greater size and height towards bringing greater light into the cathedral interiors and adding more extensive decoration. The architects made the vertical columns and supports thinner, made extensive use of pinnacles and mouldings. They combined the triforium gallery and the clerestory into single space and filled it with stained glass. They made extensive use of mouldings and bar tracery to decorate the exteriors and interiors.

Among the most prominent features of the Rayonnant style were the enormous rose windows installed in the transepts and facades, made possible by the use of bar tracery. The design of the windows gave the name Rayonnant ("Radiant") to the style.

The style was developed in the major reconstruction of the Abbey of Saint-Denis (1231) The first major church built in the new style was Amiens Cathedral (1220–1271). Later examples include Sainte-Chapelle, the royal chapel of King Louis IX of France (1248); the new north and south transepts of Notre Dame de Paris (1250–1270), and the church of Saint-Urbain de Troyes (1262).

Rayonnant cathedrals soon appeared outside of France. One of the first was Cologne Cathedral, begun in 1248. After an interruption from 1528 to 1832, the cathedral was completed in 1880. The style also spread to England with the construction of Westminster Abbey after 1245; it was amalgamated with other elements of English Gothic Architecture to form the Decorated style.

After the mid-14th century, Rayonnant was succeeded by the more ornate Flamboyant style.

== Periods ==
Rayonnant (French pronunciation: [ʁɛjɔnɑ̃]) style is the third of the four phases of Gothic architecture in France, as defined by French scholars. It succeeded Classic Gothic, the style of Bourges, Chartres and Reims.

In the English division of Continental Gothic into three phases (Early, High, Late Gothic), it is the second and larger part of High Gothic.

After the mid-14th century, Rayonnant was gradually replaced by the more ornate and highly decorated Flamboyant style.

== Name ==
The term "Rayonnant" comes from the radiating spokes of the rose windows of the major cathedrals. The term was first used by 19th-century French art historians (notably Henri Focillon and Ferdinand de Lasteyrie) to classify Gothic styles on the basis of window tracery, though tracery was just one facet of the underlying style, and radiating rose windows can also be seen on earlier cathedrals, like Chartres and Reims.

== Rayonnant in France ==
The style originated during the reign of Louis IX of France, or Saint Louis, from 1226 to 1270. During his reign, France was the wealthiest and most powerful nation in Europe. Louis was devoutly religious and was a major patron of the Catholic Church and arts. The University of Paris, or Sorbonne, was founded under his rule, as a school of theology. The major Rayonnant cathedrals had his patronage, and his royal chapel, Sainte-Chapelle, which he built to house his extensive collection of relics of the Saints, is considered one of the major landmarks of Rayonnant Gothic.

=== Basilica of Saint-Denis rebuilding (1231) ===
The Basilica of Saint-Denis, which had been the most influential initial building of Gothic style, developed problems of stability in the early 13th century. Therefore, the upper parts of the choir as well as the nave and the transepts were rebuilt beginning in 1231, opening up a greater amount of interior space (and altering beyond recognition some of the original Gothic features created by Suger). The walls were rebuilt with much larger windows, which opened up the upper elevation from the main arcades to the apexes of the vaults. The apse, once dark, was filled with light. In this campaign, the first triforia with windows were built. This was the onset of Rayonnant Gothic.

Basilica of Saint-Denis, rebuilding begun in 1231

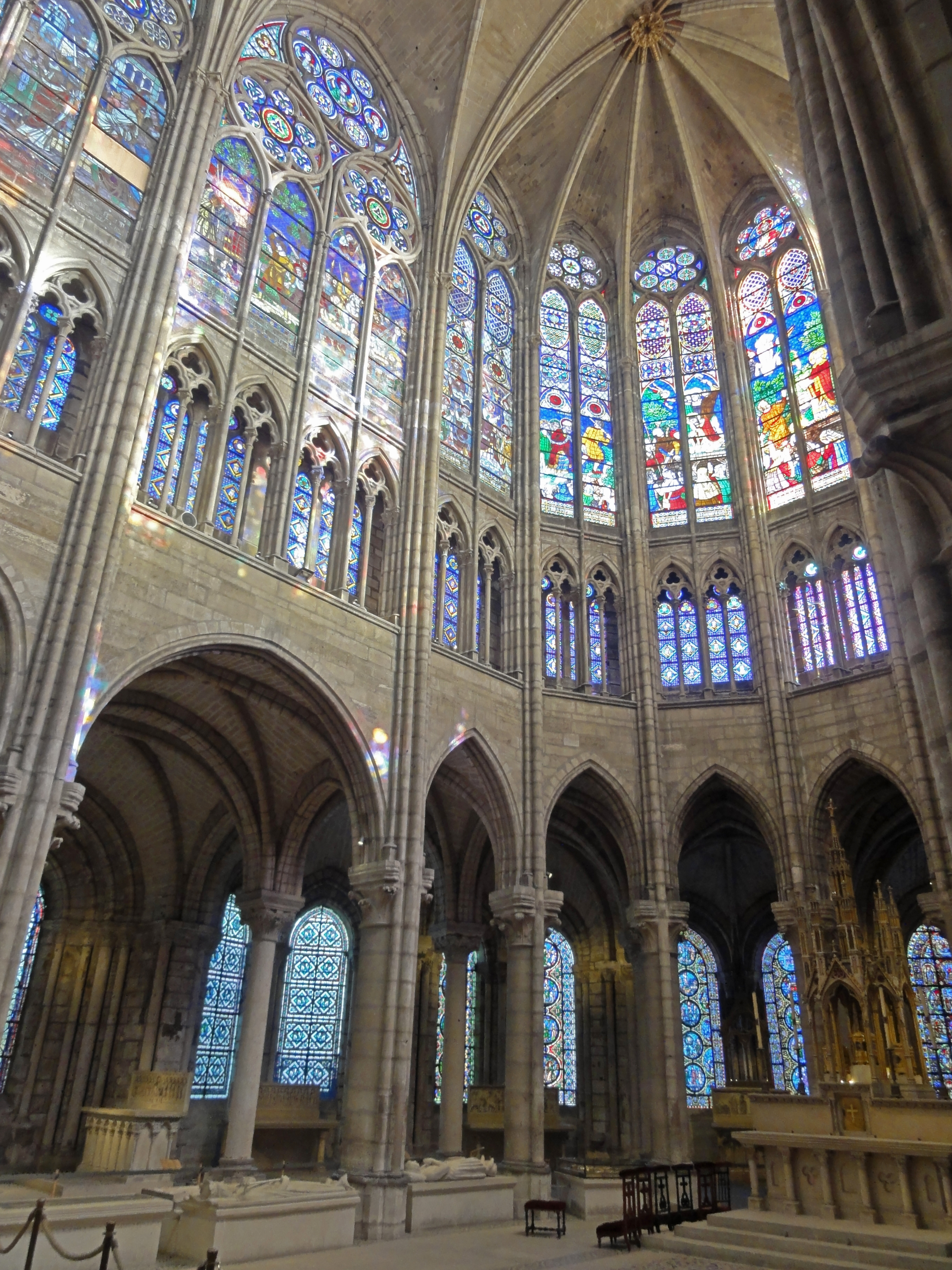
Rayonnant windows of clerestory and triforium, Early Gothic below

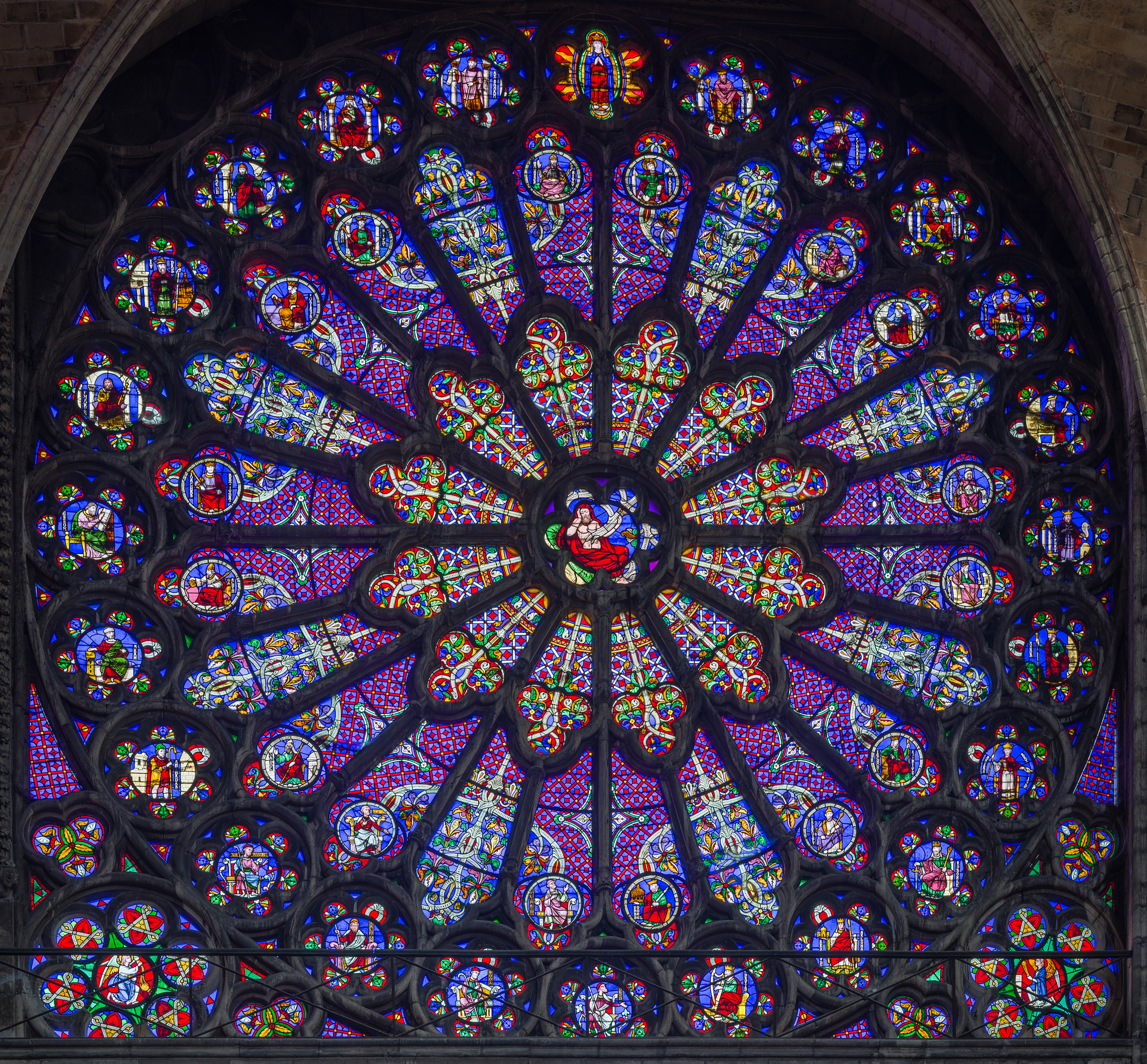
Rayonnant rose window

=== Amiens Cathedral ===
The construction of Amiens Cathedral had begun in 1220 with its western parts, in the more advanced version of Classic Gothic, similar to the eastern parts of Reims Cathedral, at the same time. Its builder, Bishop Evrard de Fouilly, set out to build the largest cathedral in France; one-hundred forty-five meters long, and seventy meters wide, with a surface area of 7700 square meters. The vaults are 42.5 meters high. The nave was completed by 1235.

After the necessary enlargement of the area enclosed by the city wall, in 1236, began the construction of transept and choir, which was completed between 1241 and 1269. Here, the innovations were applied, that had been initiated in the relaunch of Saint-Denis abbey church.

The western rose window was renewed in the 16th century in Flamboyant style. A close study of the tympanum in 1992 revealed traces of paint, indicating that it was entirely painted in bright colours. The original appearance is simulated today on special occasions with coloured lights.

Amiens Cathedral

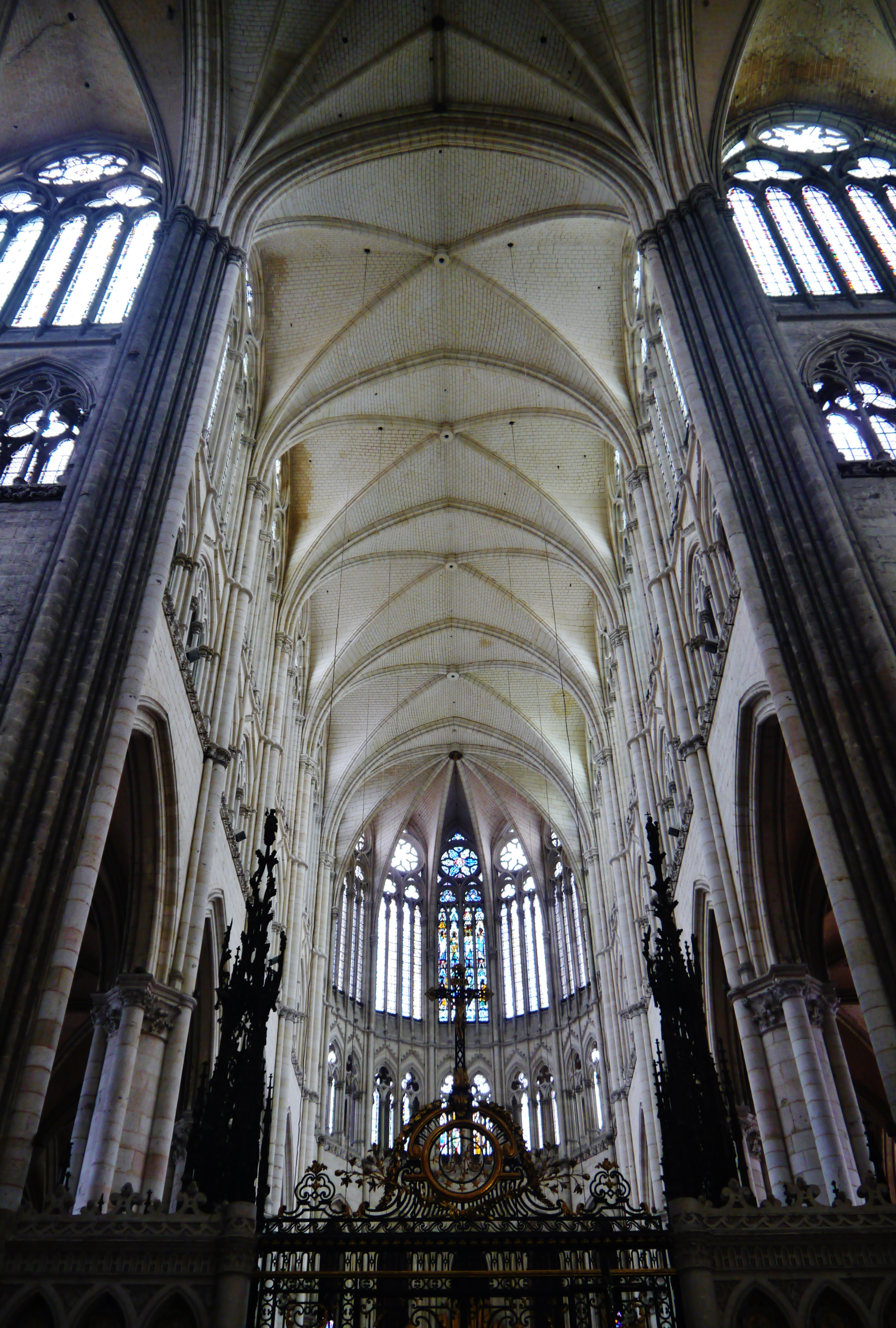
Rayonnant choir, begun in 1236, mainly 1241–1258

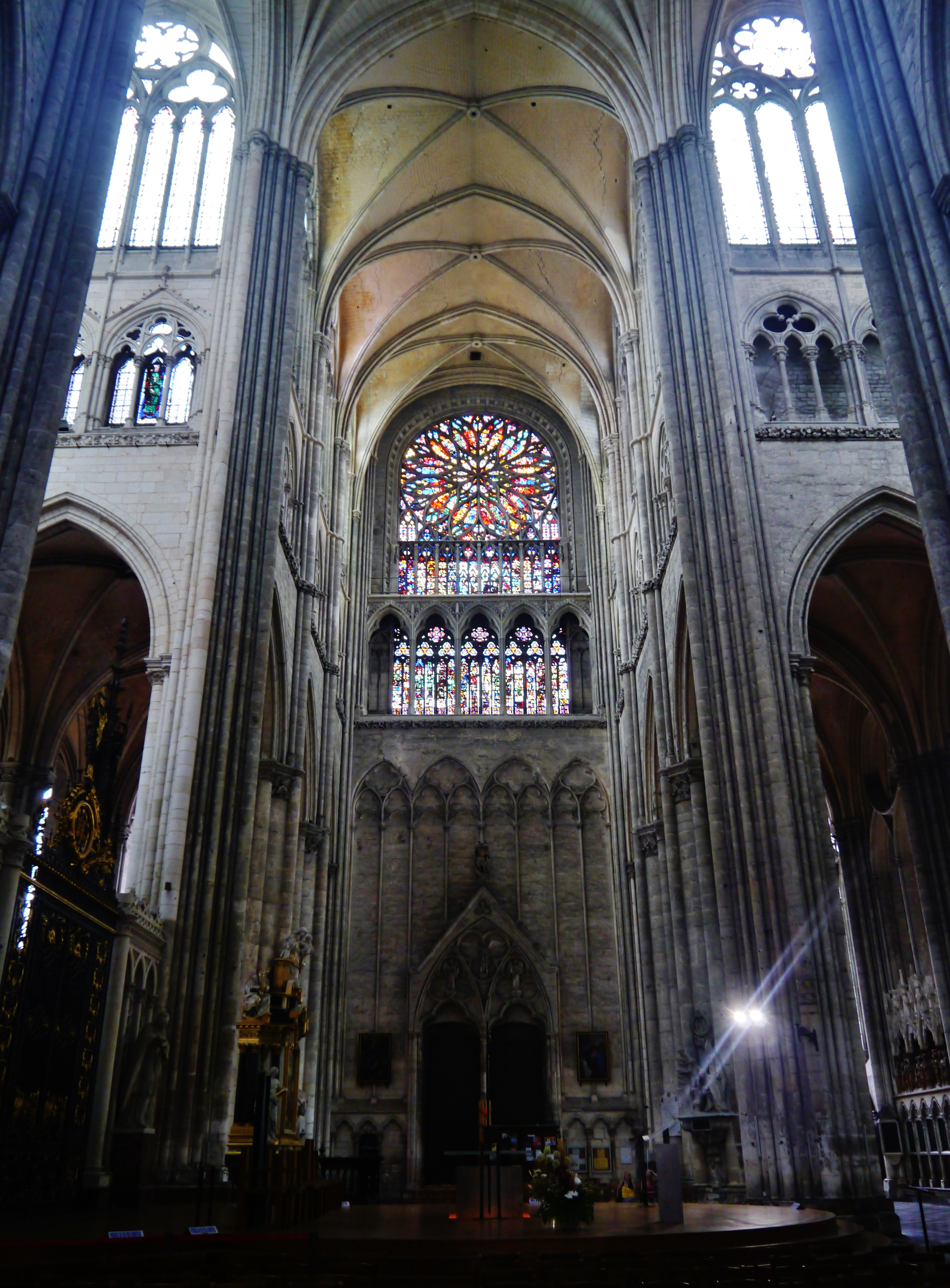
Southern transept of Amiens Cathedral: To the right the nave of Classic Gothic, to the left the Rayonnant choir

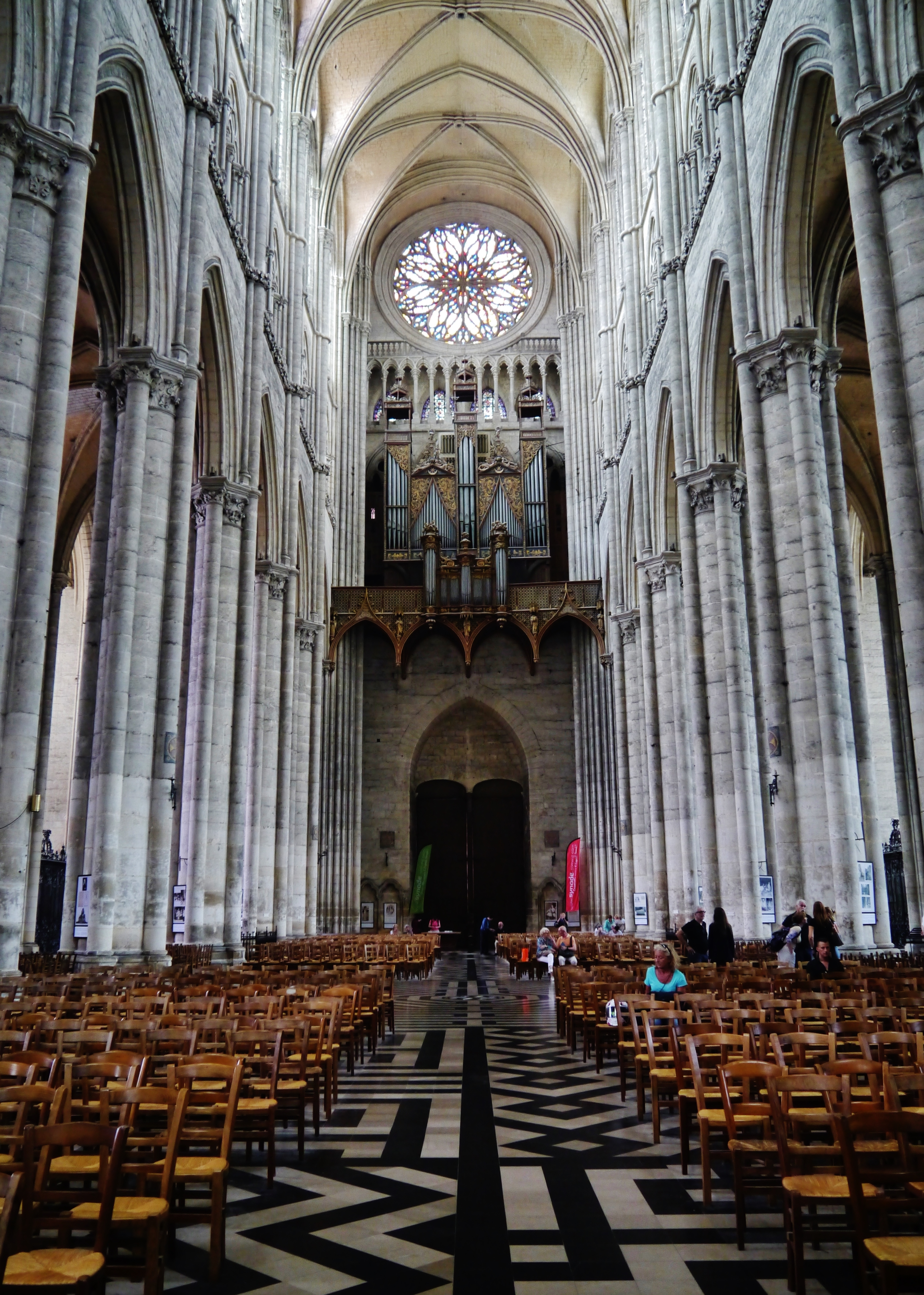
Nave of Classic Gothic, before 1235; Flamboyant rose window of 15th century

=== Notre-Dame de Paris ===
The Cathedral of Notre-Dame de Paris also received a major makeover into the new style. Between 1220 and 1230, flying buttresses were constructed to replace the old wall buttresses, and to support the walls of upper level. Thirty-seven new windows were installed, each one six meters high, each with a double-arched window topped by a rose. (Twenty-five are still in place, twelve in the nave and thirteen in the choir.).

The first rose window of Notre-Dame was built on the west facade in the 1220s. In the Middle Ages, the rose was the symbol of the Virgin Mary, to whom the cathedral was dedicated. The west window was smaller, with thick spokes of stone. The larger transept windows were added in about 1250 (north) and 1260 (south), with much more ornate designs and thinner mullions, or ribs, between the glass. The north window was devoted to the events of the Old Testament, and the South to the teachings of Christ and the New Testament.

Notre Dame de Paris

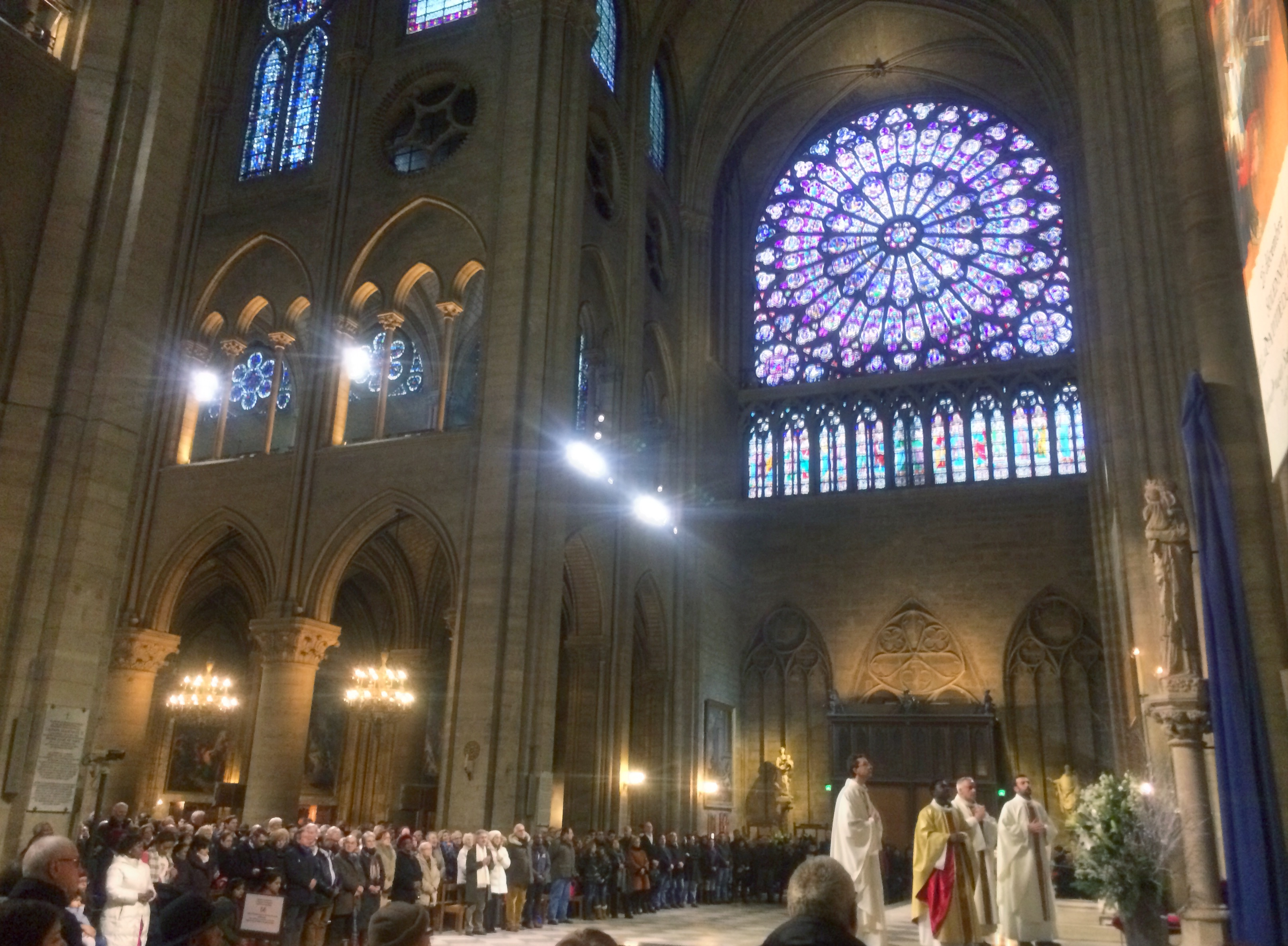
Rayonnant rose window of the north transept (1250s), Primary or Early Gothic tribune windows (before 1190), one Classic or High Gothic clerestory (c. 1200)

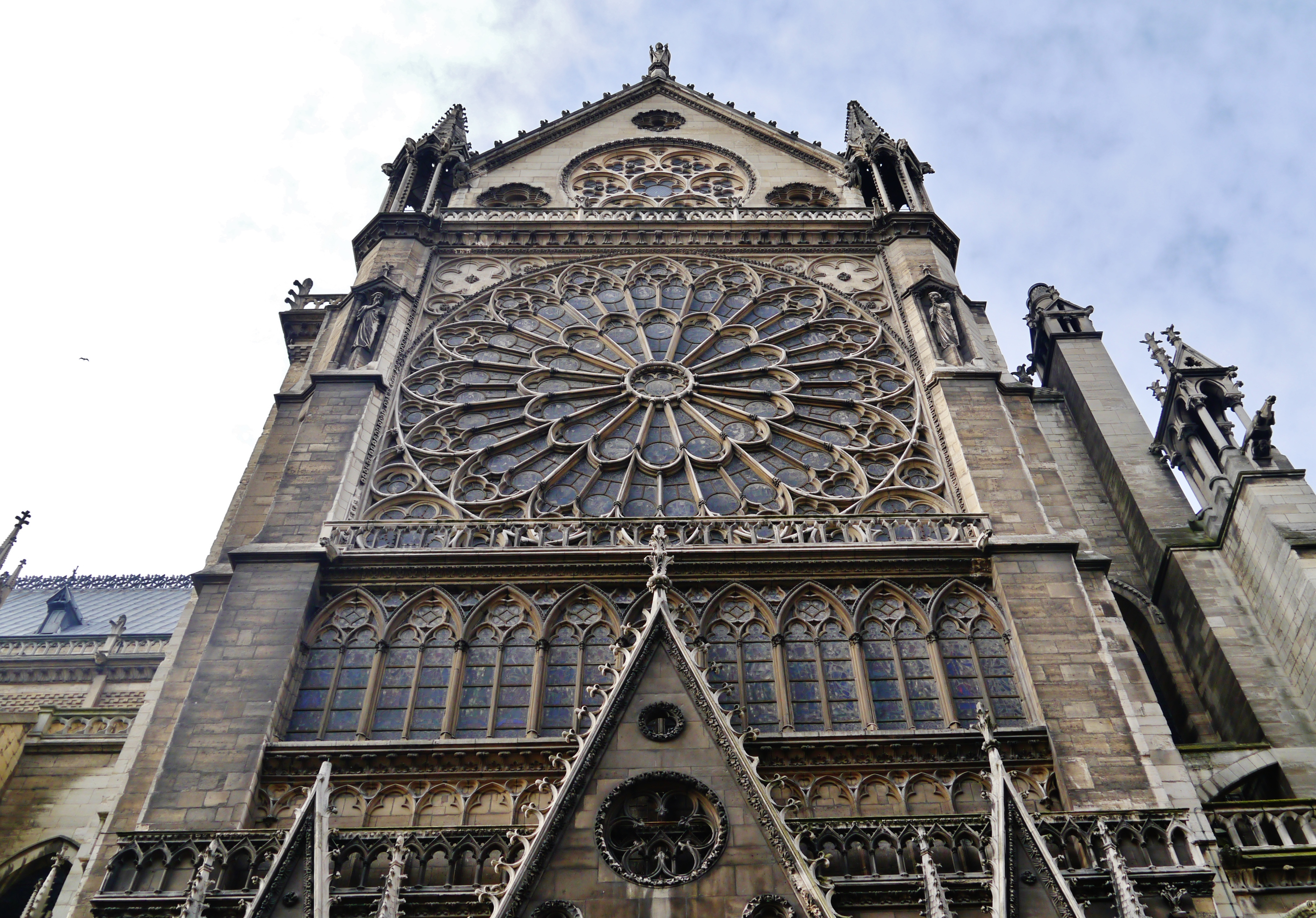
North transept outside

=== Le Mans and Tours ===
Rayonnant spread quickly from the Île de France to other parts of France Normandy, in many projects already under construction. At Le Mans Cathedral in Normandy, the Bishop Geoffrey de Loudon modified the plans to add double flying arches and high windows divided into lancets, as well as a circle of new Rayonnant chapels. Tours Cathedral had an even more ambitious program, financed with the assistance of Louis IX between 1236 and 1279. Its most striking Rayonnant feature was the fusion of the windows of the triforium and high clerestory windows to create a curtain of stained glass, similar to that of Sainte-Chapelle.

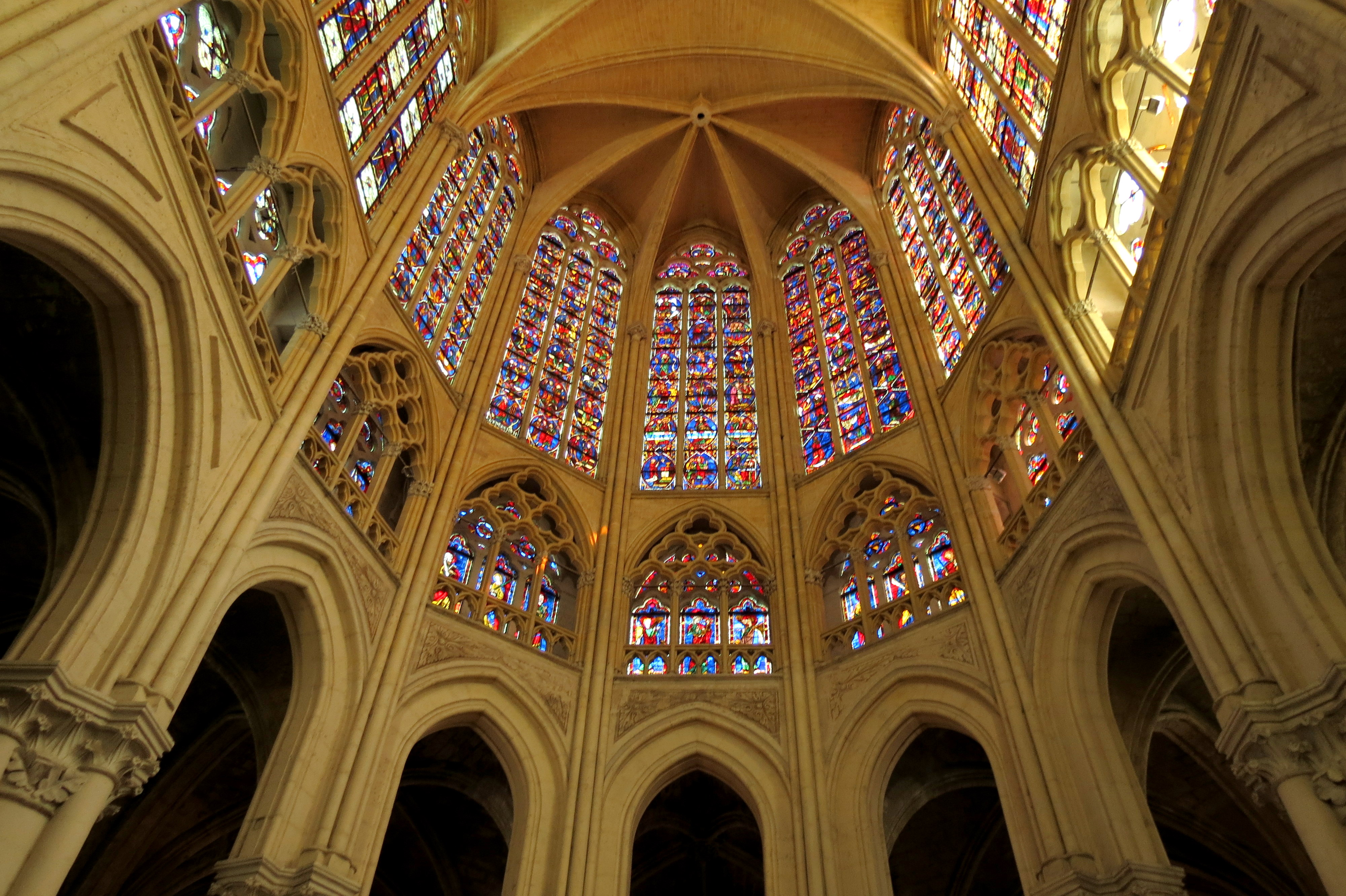
Combination of the triforium and clerestory windows of Tours Cathedral (1236–1279)

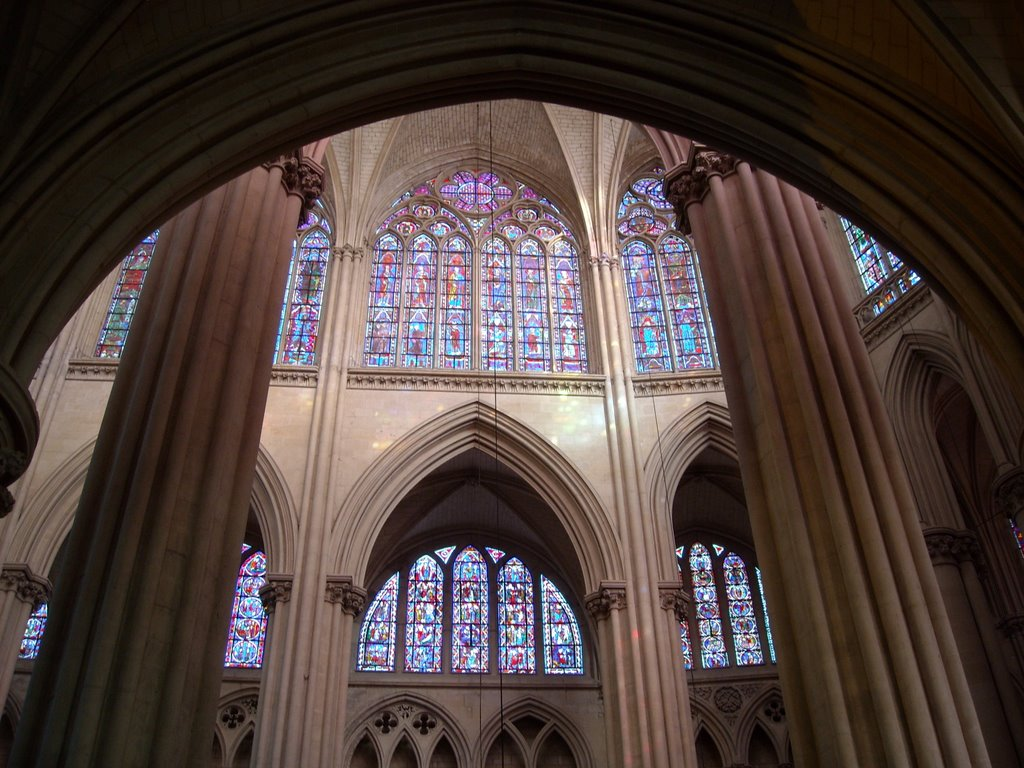
Triforium and Clerestory of Le Mans Cathedral (mid-13th century)

=== Sainte-Chapelle (1248) ===
Sainte-Chapelle, the chapel constructed by Louis IX for the relics of the Passion of Christ that he had brought back from the Crusades, consecrated in 1248, is considered the summit of the Rayonnant style. It served as a model of several similar chapels around Europe, in Aachen, Riom, and Sainte-Chapelle de Vincennes at the edge of Paris. The glass was heavily coloured, the walls were brightly painted, and the portions of the walls not covered with glass were densely covered with sculpted and painted tracery.

Sainte-Chapelle, consecrated in 1248

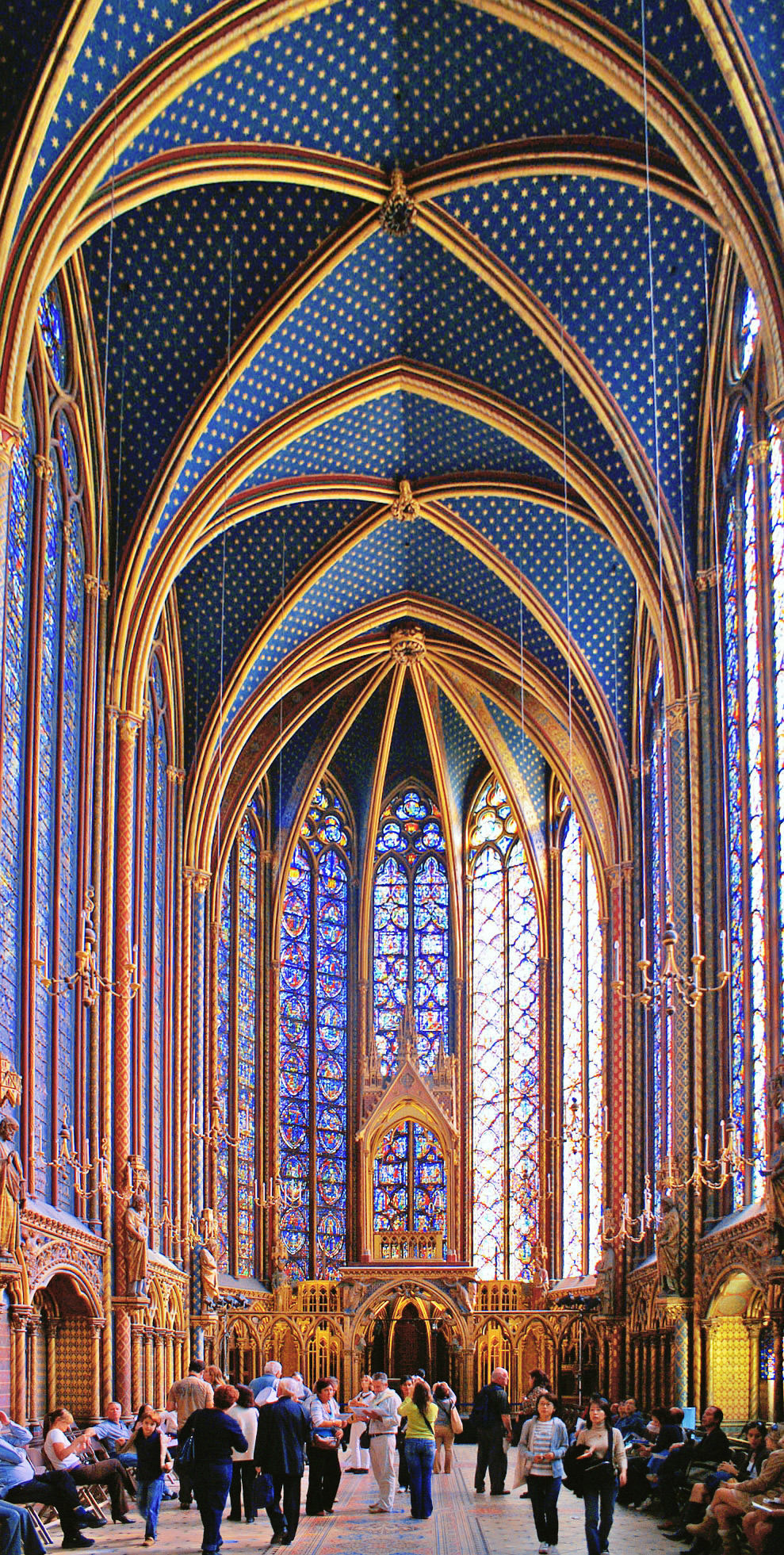
Upper level

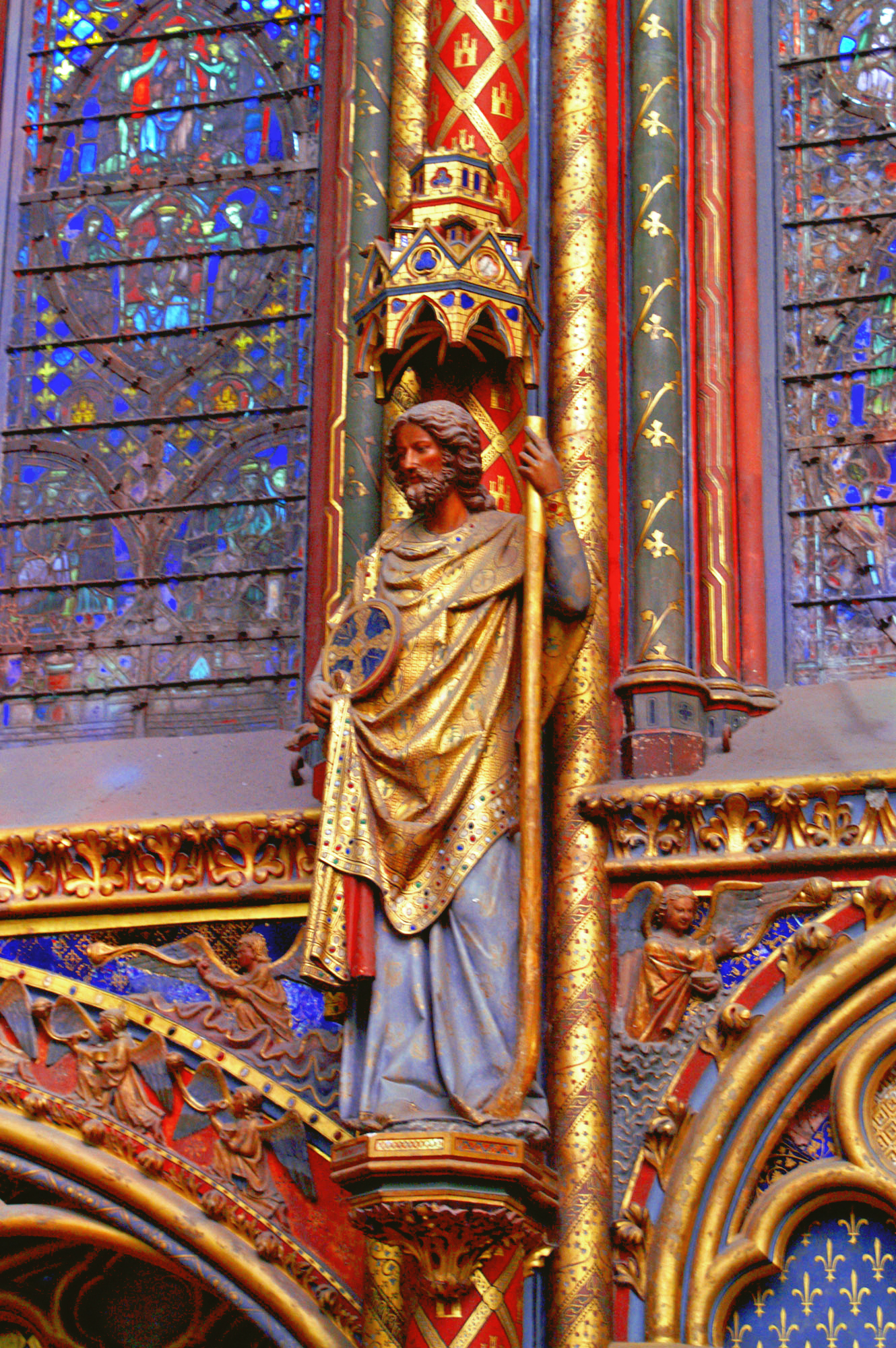
Sculpted figure

== Decorated Style in England ==
An English derivative of the Rayonnant style began to appear in the middle of the 13th century. Thomas Rickman gave the English version the term "Decorated Period". English Historians sometimes subdivide this style into two periods, based on the predominant motifs of the designs. The first, the Geometric style (c.1245-1315), where ornament was more like that of the French Rayonnant, being based on the lines of the structure, followed by the Curvilinear style (c.1290-1360) which used S-shaped ogee curves.

Henry III of England was the brother-in-law of Louis IX of France, and he had attended the consecration of Sainte-Chapelle in Paris in 1248. In 1245 he had begun reconstructing Westminster Abbey in the French style, using the French or French-trained master mason Henry of Reyns. The result was a curious combination of Classic Gothic, Rayonnant and English Gothic. The plan was based on Reims, the French coronation church, but with the long nave and transepts of an English cathedral like Salisbury. Likewise, the elevations combine the simple bar-traceried aisle windows and quadripartite vault of the Classic Gothic, the rose windows and carved angels of the Rayonnant, and the high tribune gallery, Purbeck marble shafting and surface ornamentation of the English Gothic. The Rayonnant features appear to have been introduced by a new mason, Master Albericus.

The style was soon used in other cathedrals and churches across England, particularly among projects patronised by the Court. At Salisbury Cathedral, otherwise an Early English building, a new chapter house and cloister were built, copying the design of those at Westminster, with four-light bar-traceried windows. Lincoln Cathedral saw the addition of the Angel Choir (1256–1280), with the first example of an eight-light window. The nave of York Minster (begun 1291) is an unusually orthodox Rayonnant building, with a low triforium, relatively thin walls and vaulting shafts that rise from floor to ceiling, and made York a centre of Rayonnant design, the influence of which can be seen at Howden Minster. Rather than importing the Rayonnant as a complete system, English masons saw it as merely a menu of new and exciting ornament with which to enrich buildings. Hence features like bar tracery, naturalistic carving and surface arcading were near-universally adopted very rapidly, while the verticality of continuous vaulting shafts did not catch on. English churches remained comparatively low and thick-walled, but with larger and more ornate windows punched into them. However, one lasting legacy of the Rayonnant was the abolition of the tribune gallery, which had been a feature of Norman times, in favour of the narrow band of triforium arcading. The popularity of this feature can be seen in its insertion into previously two-storeyed elevations at Exeter and Chester.

Even the elements of Rayonnant architecture which had been adapted were quickly abandoned when new forms appeared in the 1290s. The introduction of the ogee curve and the split cusp in Court circles mean that the rigidly logical geometrical tracery patterns of arches and circles were replaced by flowing tracery, ushering in the Curvilinear Decorated style. However, in the 1330s the ideas of the Rayonnant were again taken up at Old St Paul's (chapter house) and Gloucester (east end), with vertical shafts and vast windows dissolving the mass of the wall and introducing the final style of English Gothic: the Perpendicular.

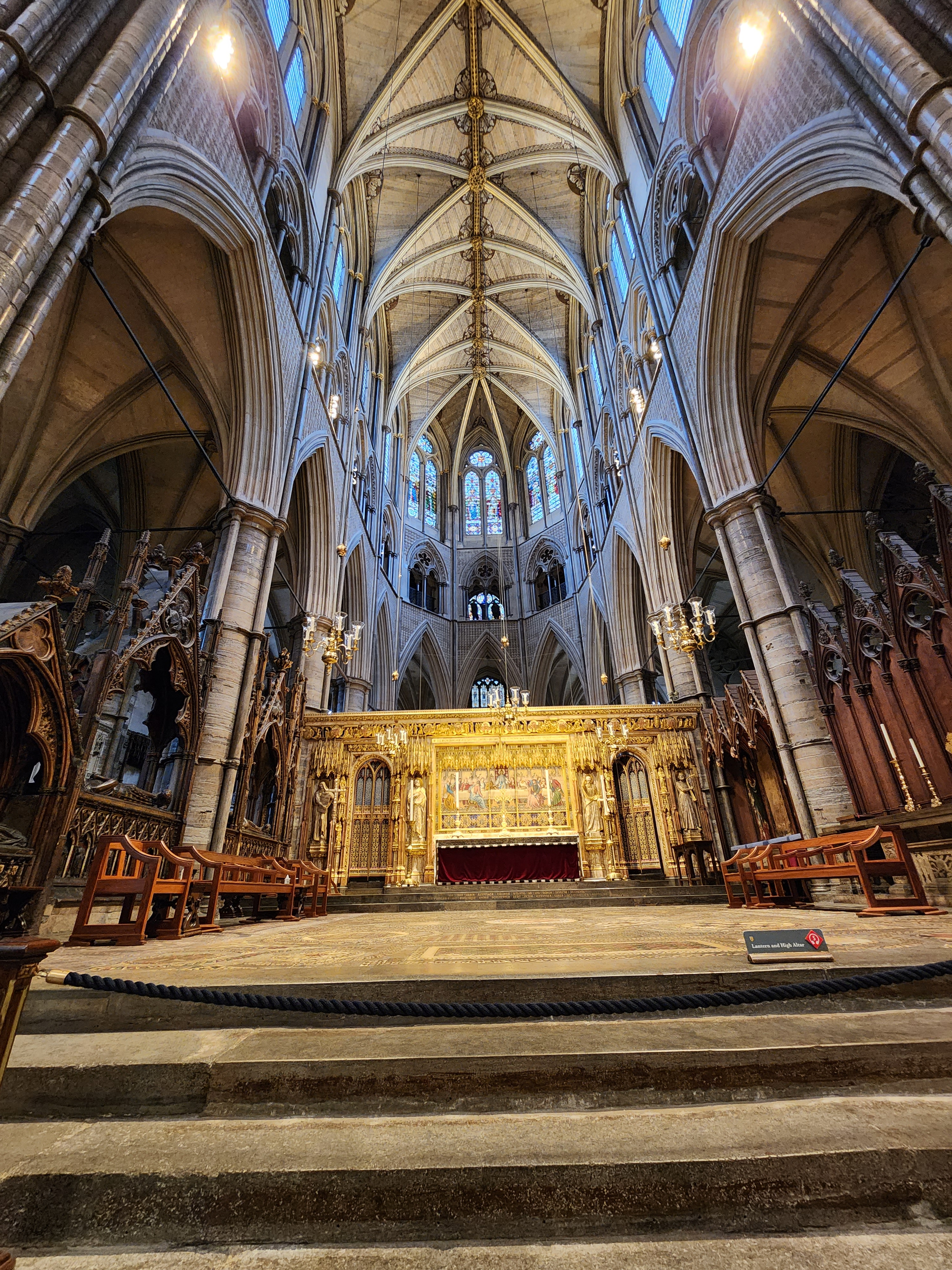
The east end of Westminster Abbey (after 1245), a building combining Classic Gothic and Rayonnant elements

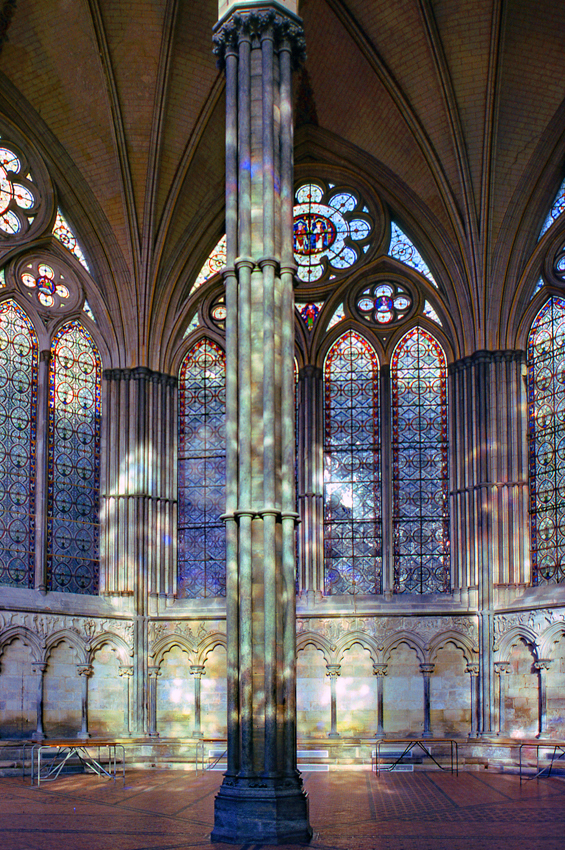
The chapter house of Salisbury Cathedral, a Rayonnant elevation on an English plan.

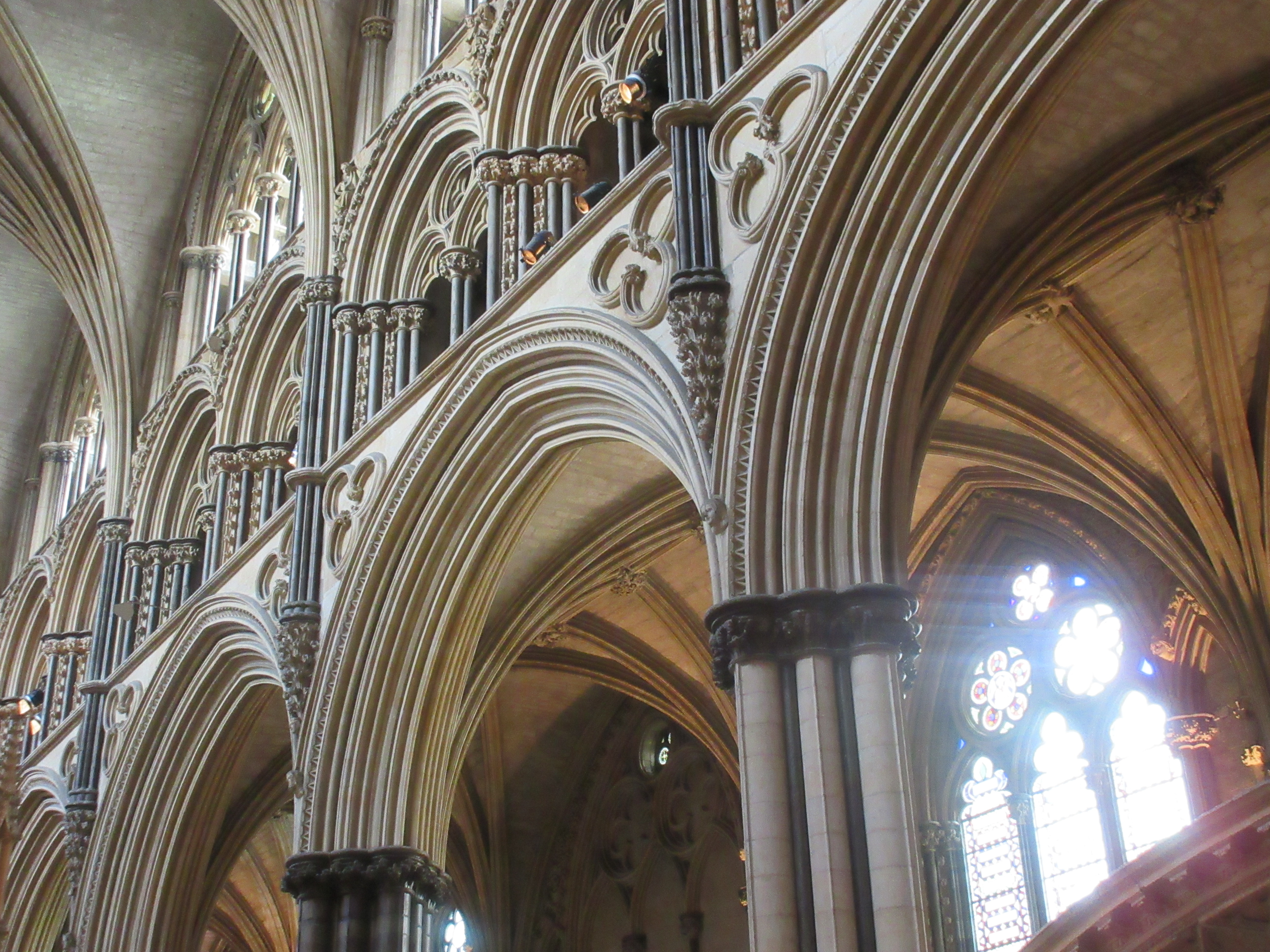
The Angel Choir of Lincoln Cathedral (1256–1280)

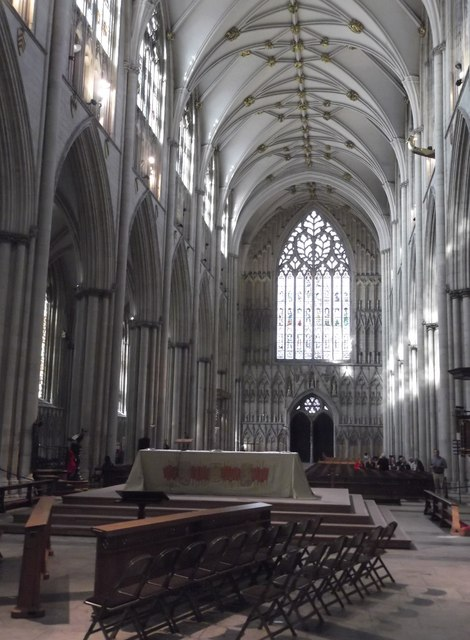
The nave of York Minster (after 1291). While the elevation is Rayonnant, the timber lierne vault and west window with flowing tracery are pure English Decorated.

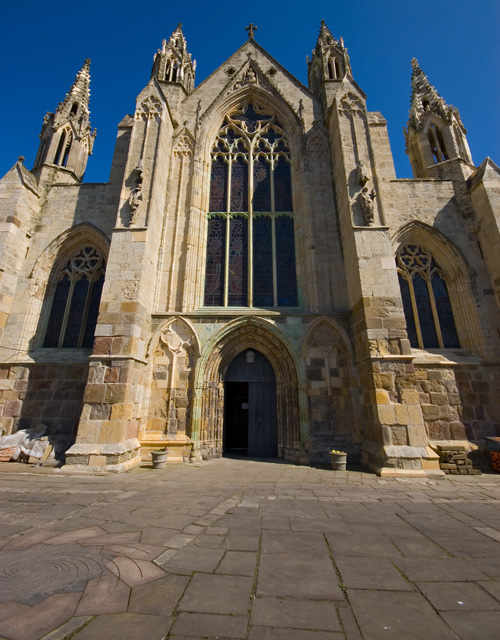
Howden Minster: the Rayonnant west front, built by York masons.

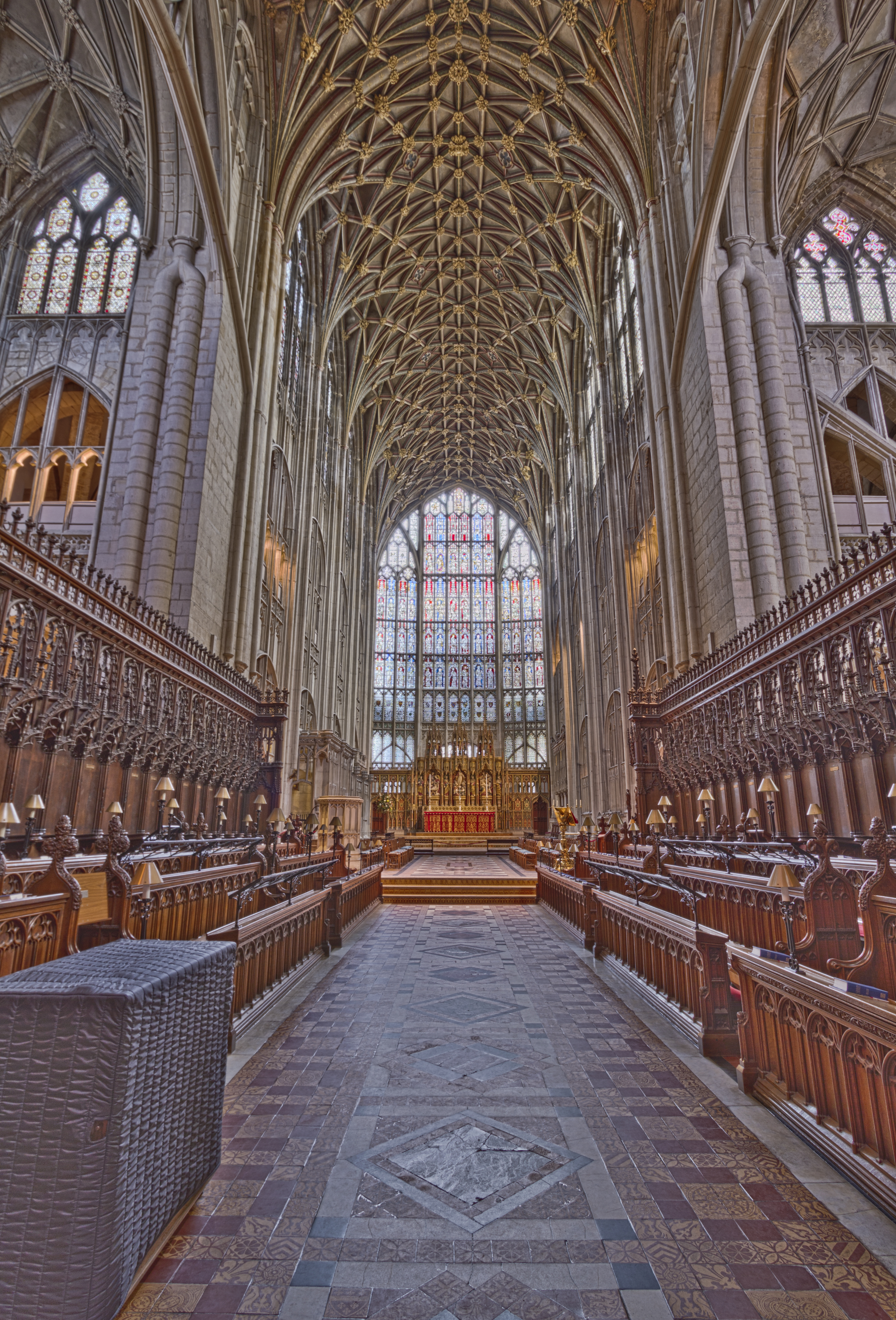
The east end of Gloucester Cathedral (c.1350). The thin clerestory walls and surface panelling finally achieve the aims of the Rayonnant.

== Central Europe ==
The Rayonnant style gradually spread to the east from Paris and was adapted to local styles. The nave of Strasbourg Cathedral, then in the Holy Roman Empire, was a notable early example. The Rayonnant phase of works was begun in 1245, with some deviations from the usual Rayonnant arrangement of arcades, which were separated by bundled columns. The three-part elevation were large windows with lancets and roses along the aisles, more windows above on the narrow Triforium, and dramatic high windows with four lancets surmounted by quadrille windows, filling the church with light. One special aspect of the cathedral was its colour; the reddish-grey stone in different shades became part of the decoration. The western façade was built in 1277. Its fine rose window of more than 13 metres diameter is divided into sixteen "soufflets", or elongated heart-shaped forms.

Another important example was Cologne Cathedral. Work began in 1248 and the choir was consecrated in 1322, but work stopped in the 14th century and was not resumed until the 19th, and not finished until 1880. Cologne Cathedral and Freiburg Minster show one distinctive feature of the German interpretation of the Rayonnant: the openwork spire.

In German literature, Rayonnant architecture is termed High Gothic (GE: Hochgotisch).

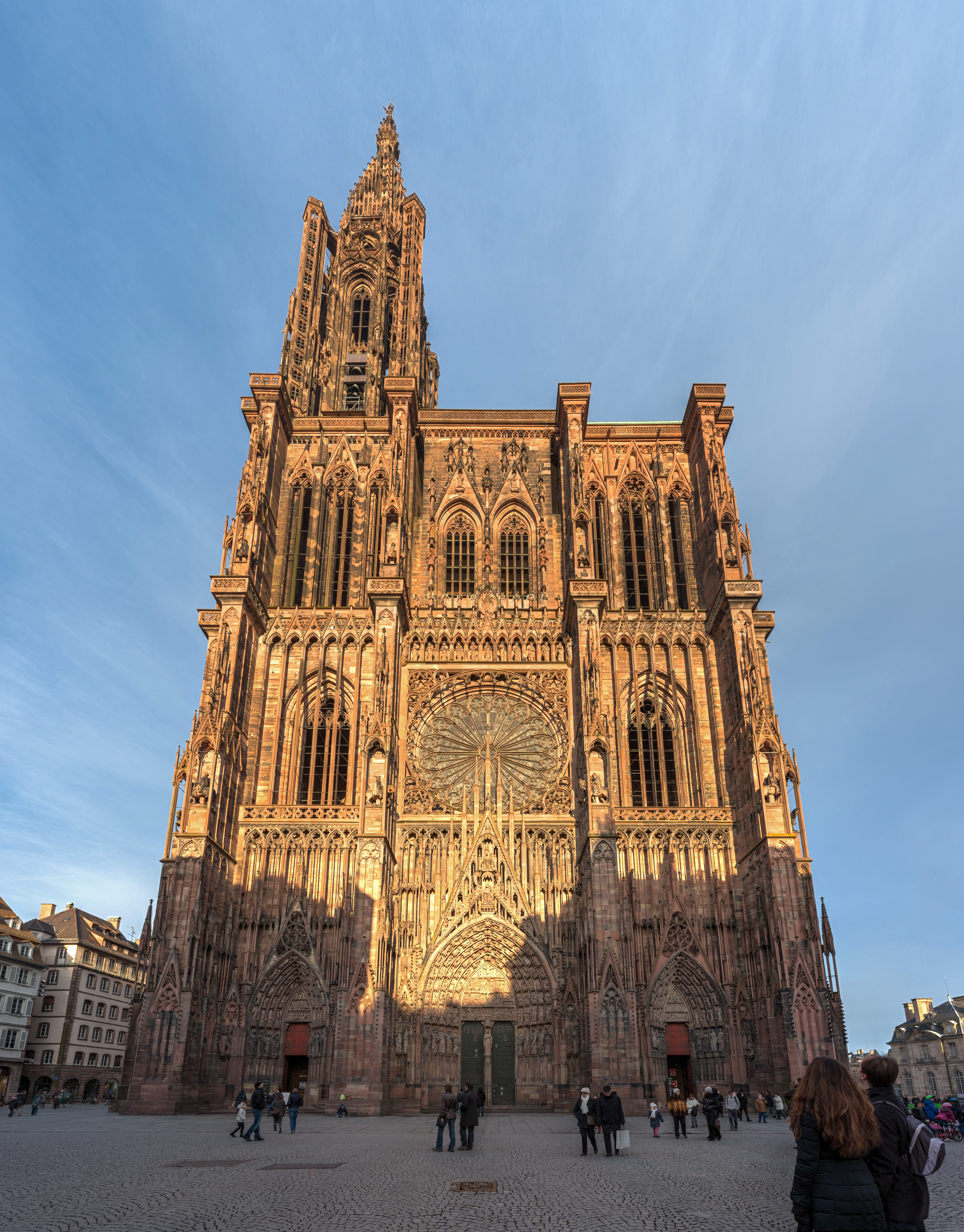
West façade and rose window of Strasbourg Cathedral, begun in 1277

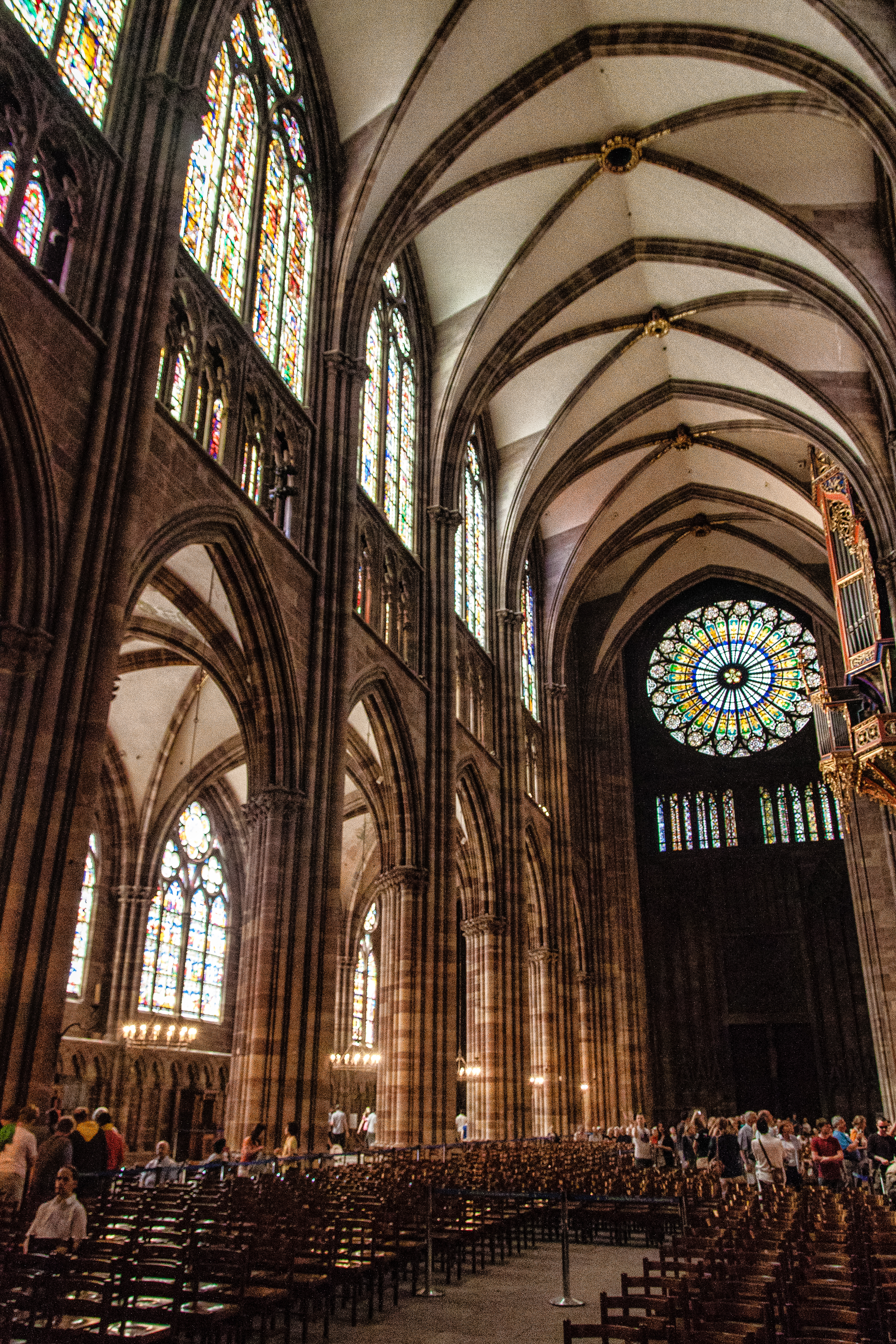
Nave of Strasbourg Cathedral, begun in 1245

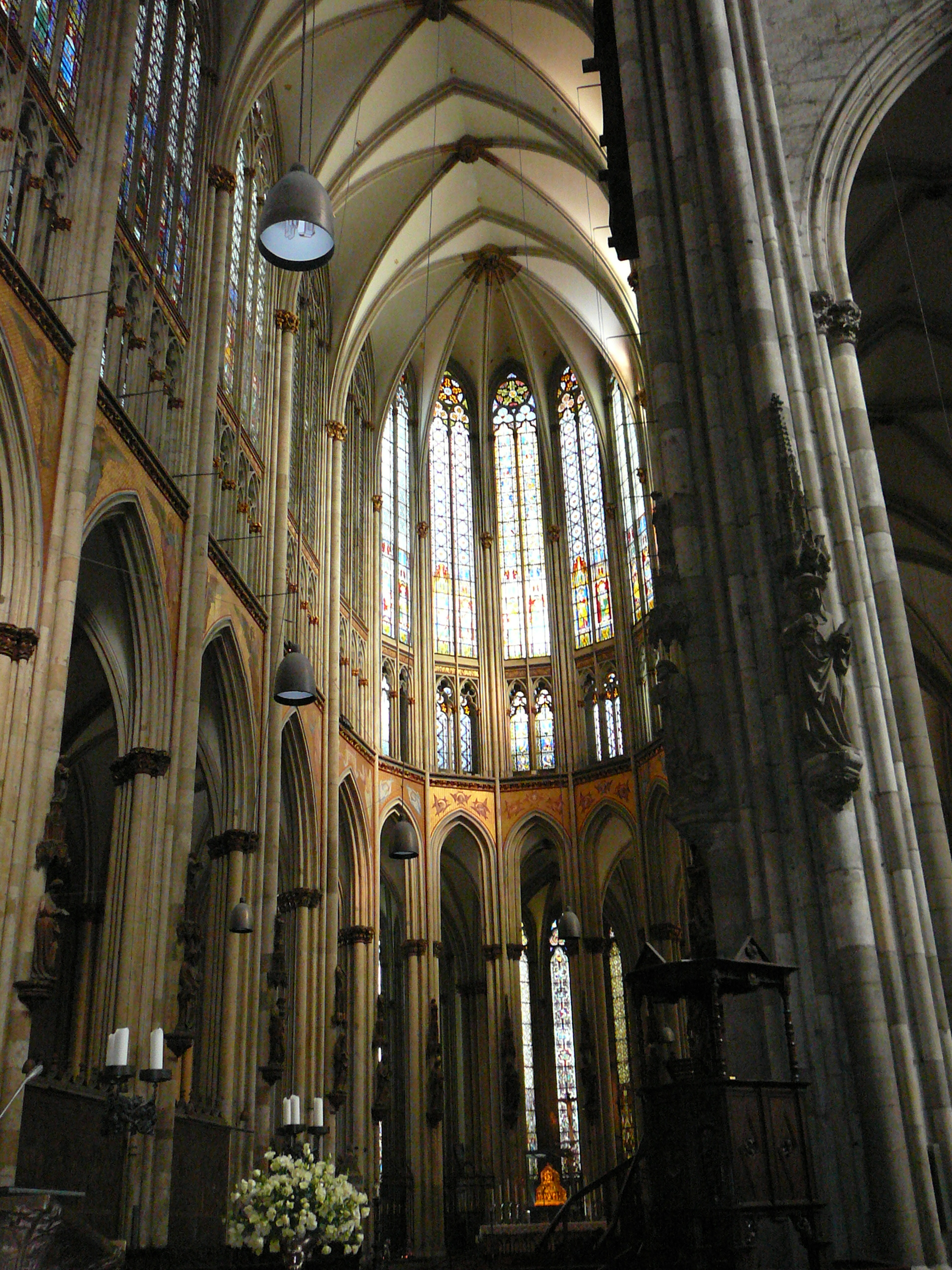
Choir of Cologne Cathedral, begun in 1248

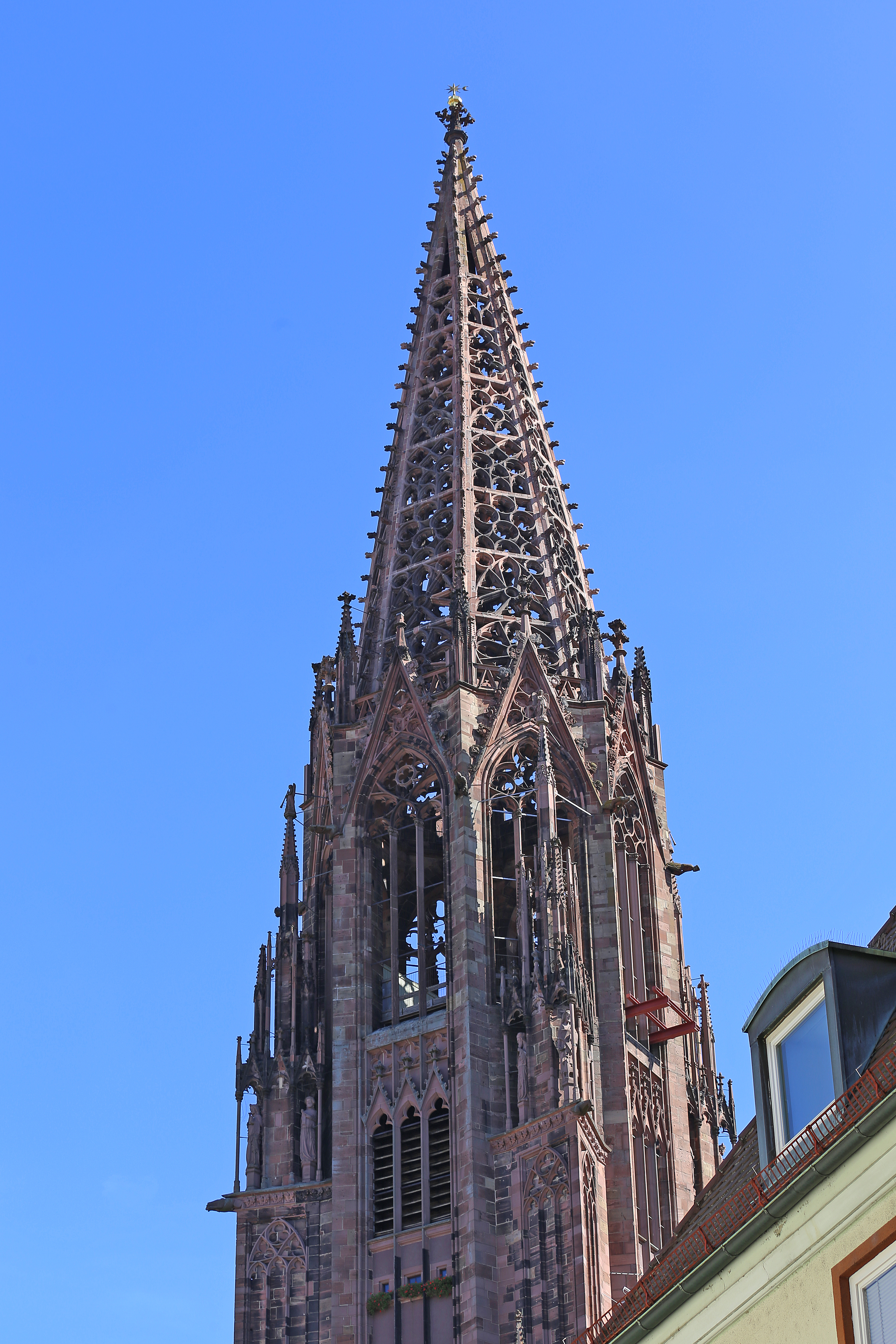
Western tower of Freiburg Minster, finished in 1330

== Spain ==
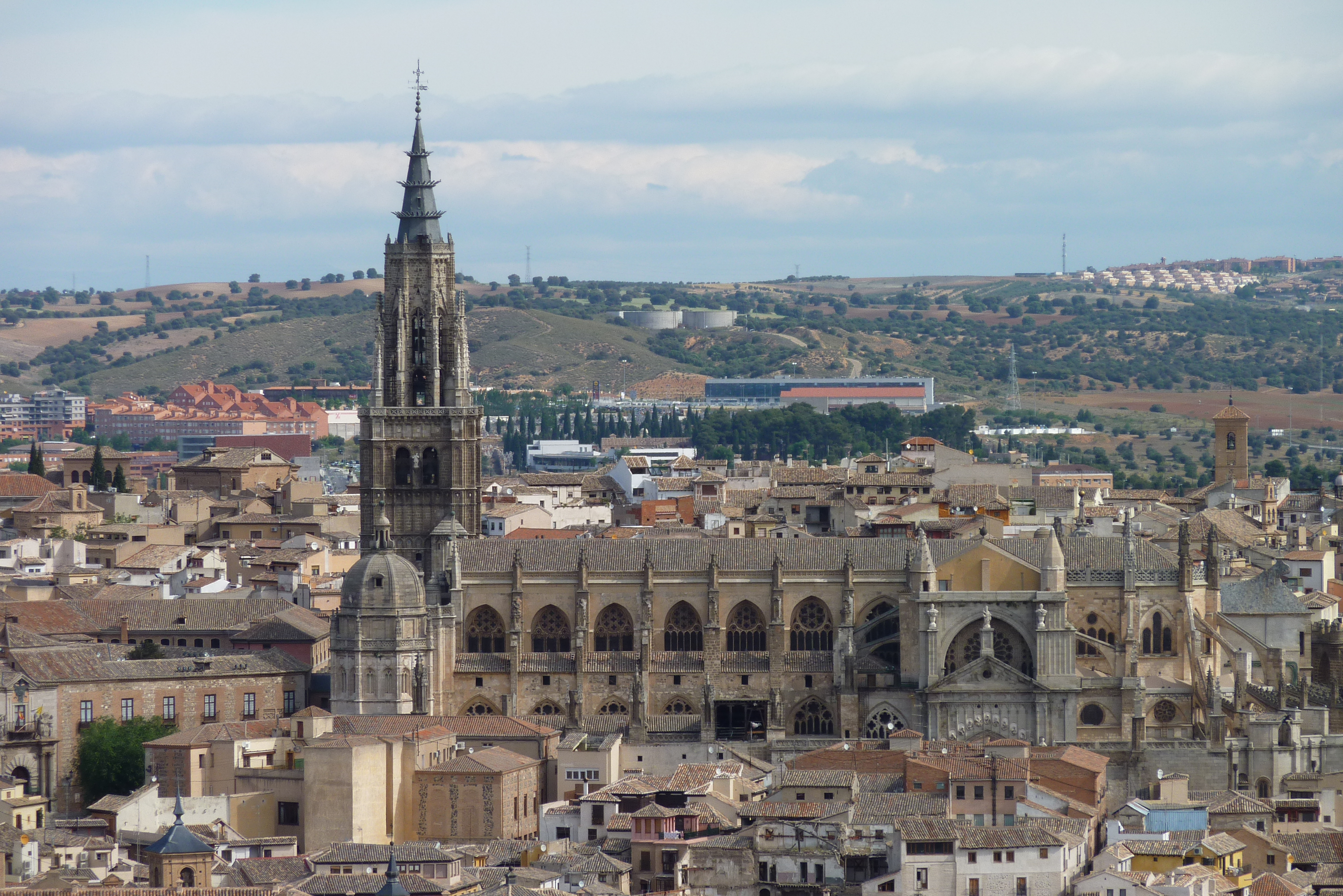
Toledo Cathedral, Rayonnant with later additions

In Spain, the Christian states of the north expanded with the success of the Reconquista. They invited specialists from France, and particularly from Germany, who introduced features from north of the Pyrenees. This way, Rayonnant appeared in Spain. But each Spanish cathedral had its own very distinctive style that was difficult to classify.

Toledo Cathedral, begun in 1226 and continued in Gothic style until 1493, shows more preference of large windows than most other churches in Spain.

Toledo Cathedral, begun in 1226

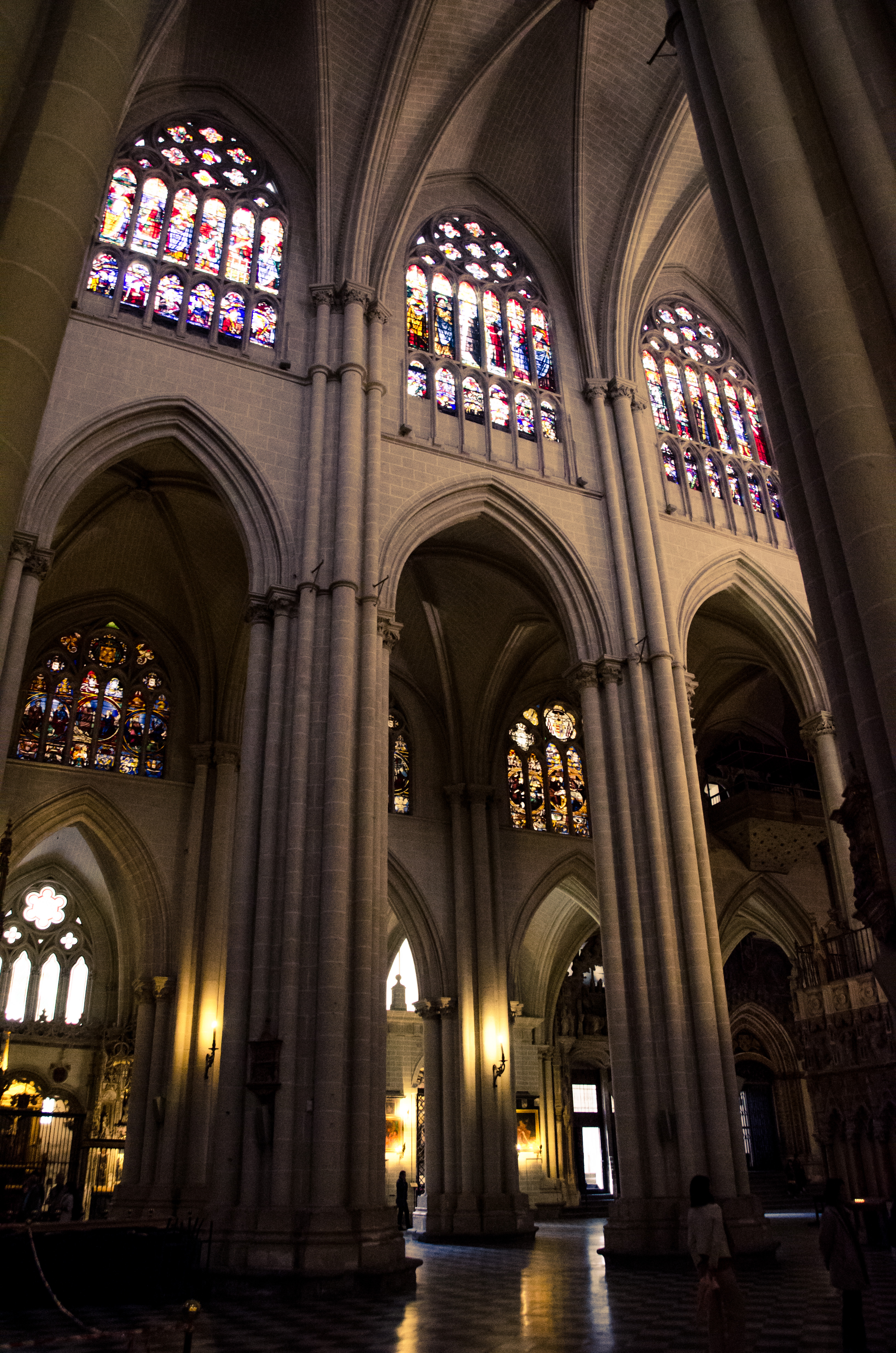
Elevations of Toledo Cathedral

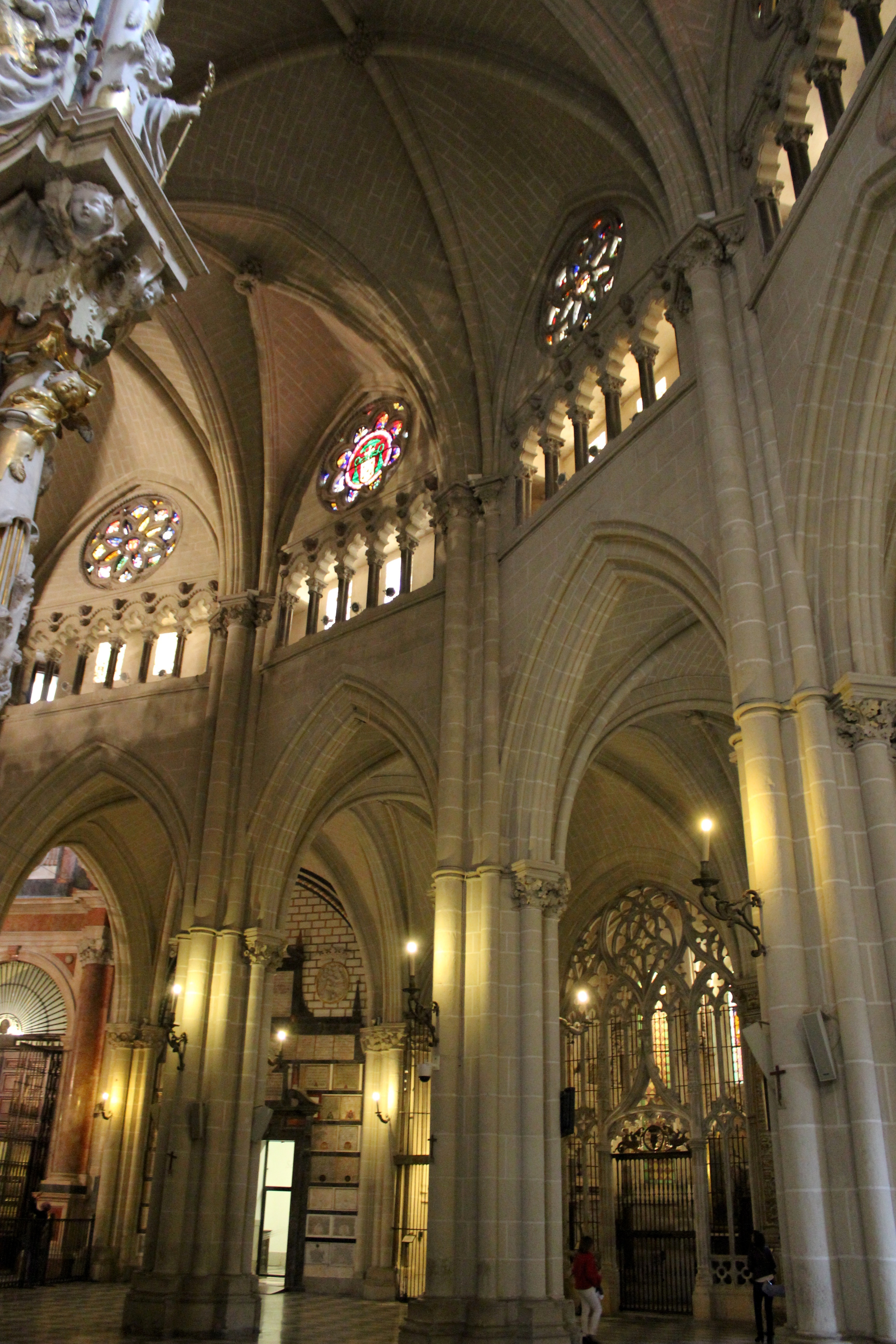
Ambulatory of Toledo Cathedral

Another important example of Rayonnant is the nave and transepts of León Cathedral, begun 1255. Other examples in Spain include Burgos cathedral, though it was much modified in the time of Flamboyant Gothic.

León Cathedral, begun in 1255

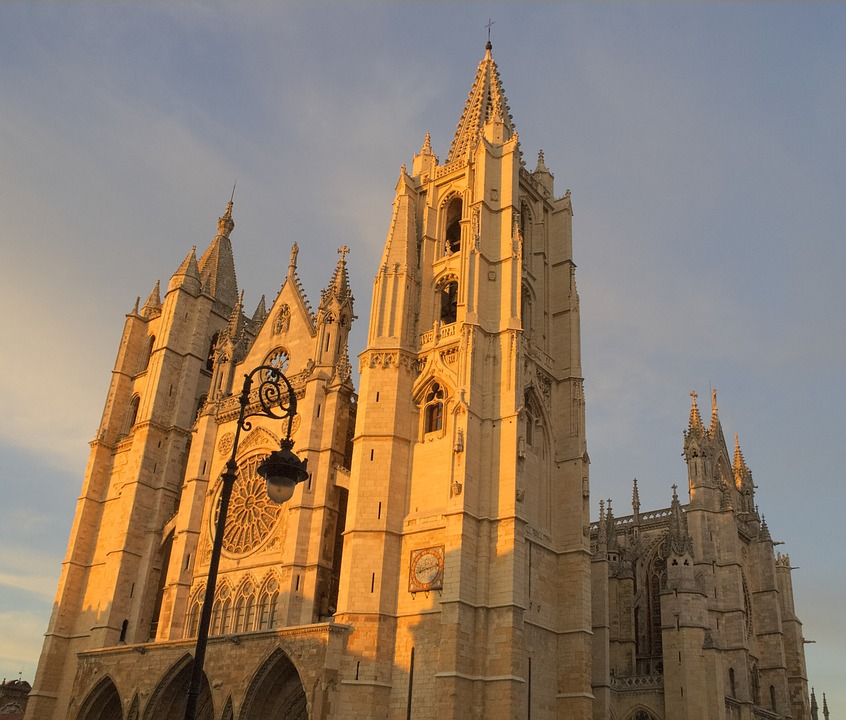

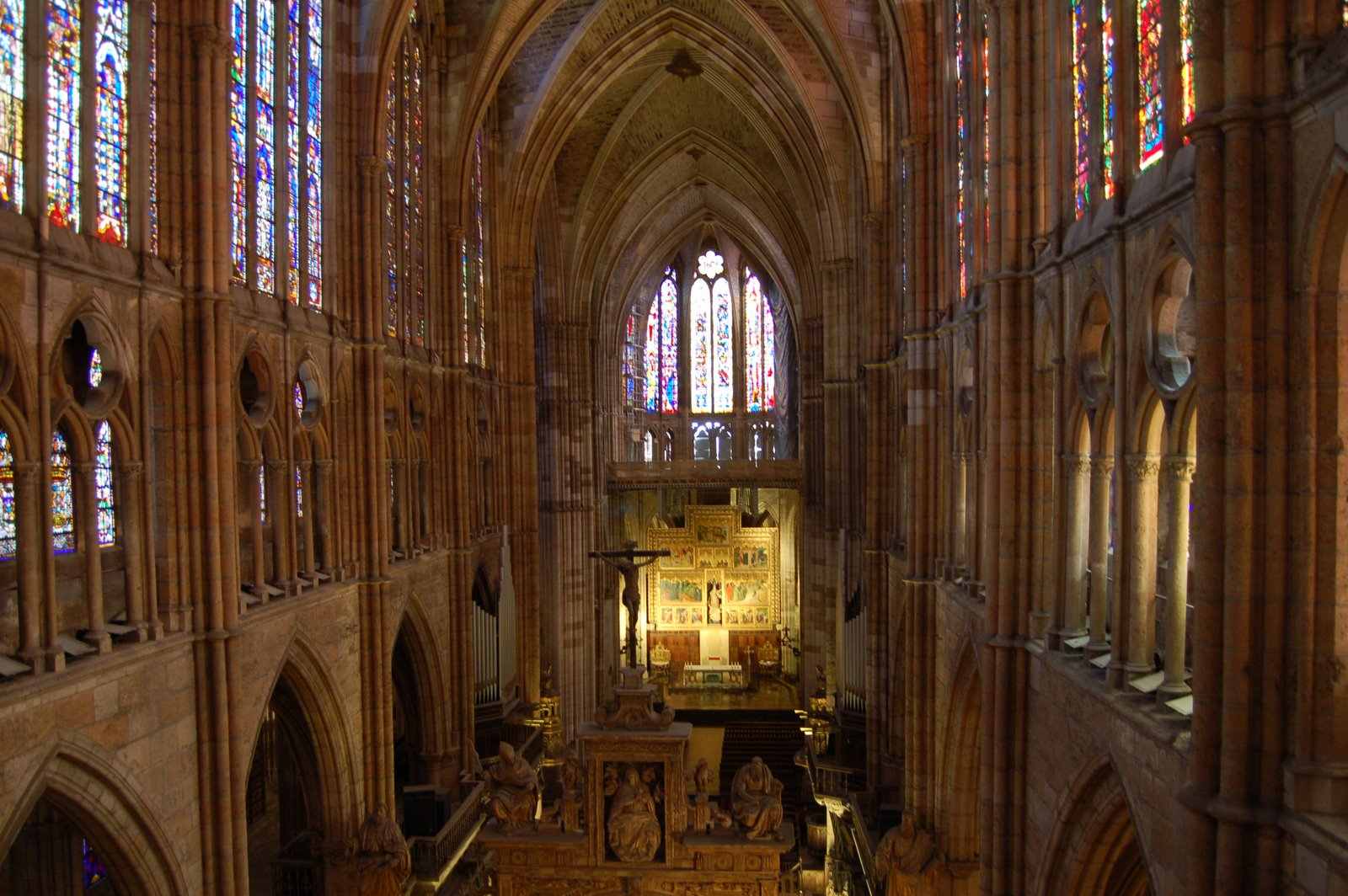

Gerona Cathedral, begun in 1292, has triforia without windows. In Barcelona, two large churches were built, parallelly, the cathedral 1298 to 1448 (without the facade, which was added as late as after 1882, and the central tower, added 1906–1911) and Santa Maria del Mar, 1324 to 1384. Besides some elaborate tracery in Santa Maria del Mar, both have dominant Catalonian character and little Rayonnant elements.

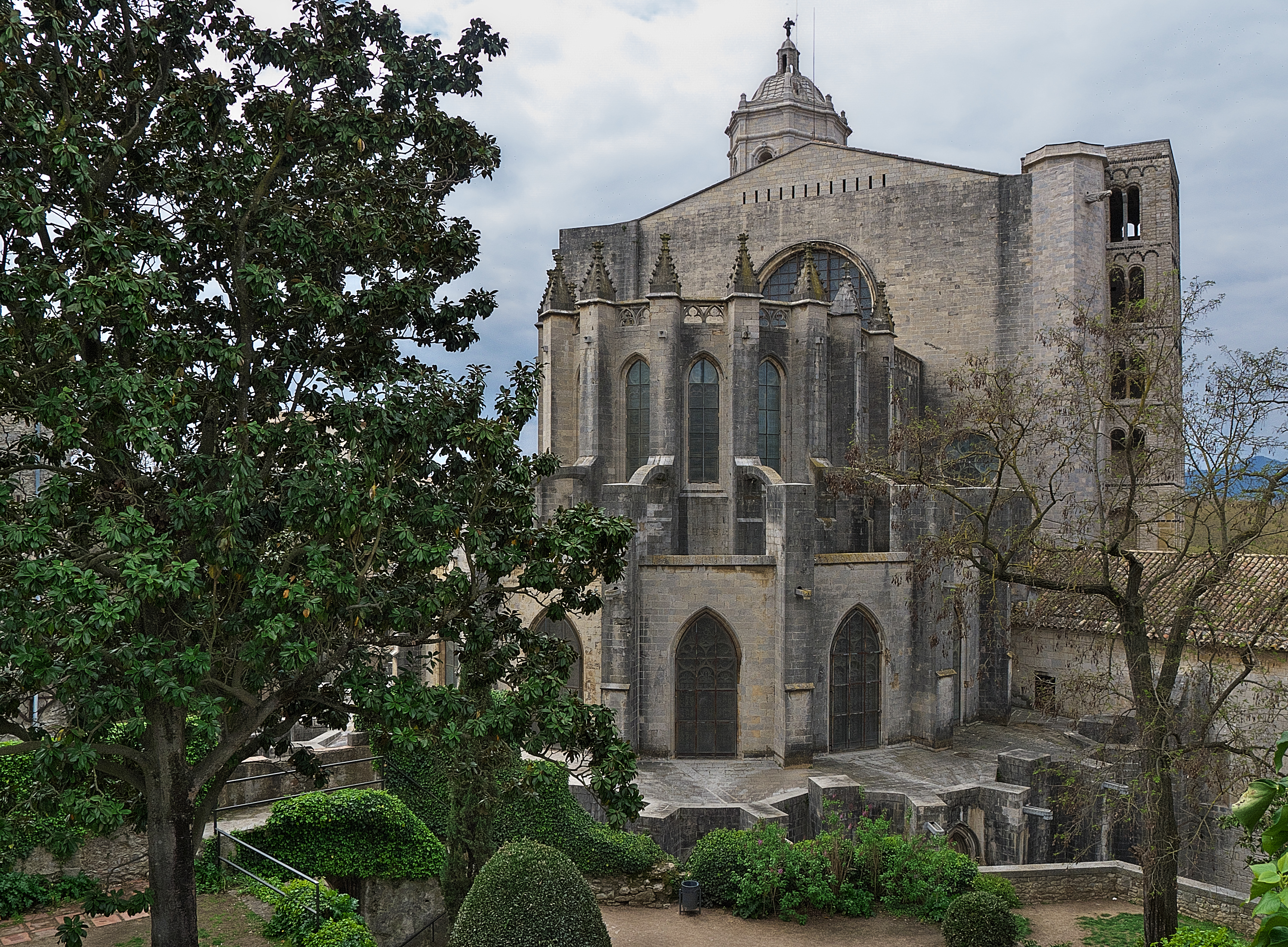
Girona Cathedral, begun in 1292

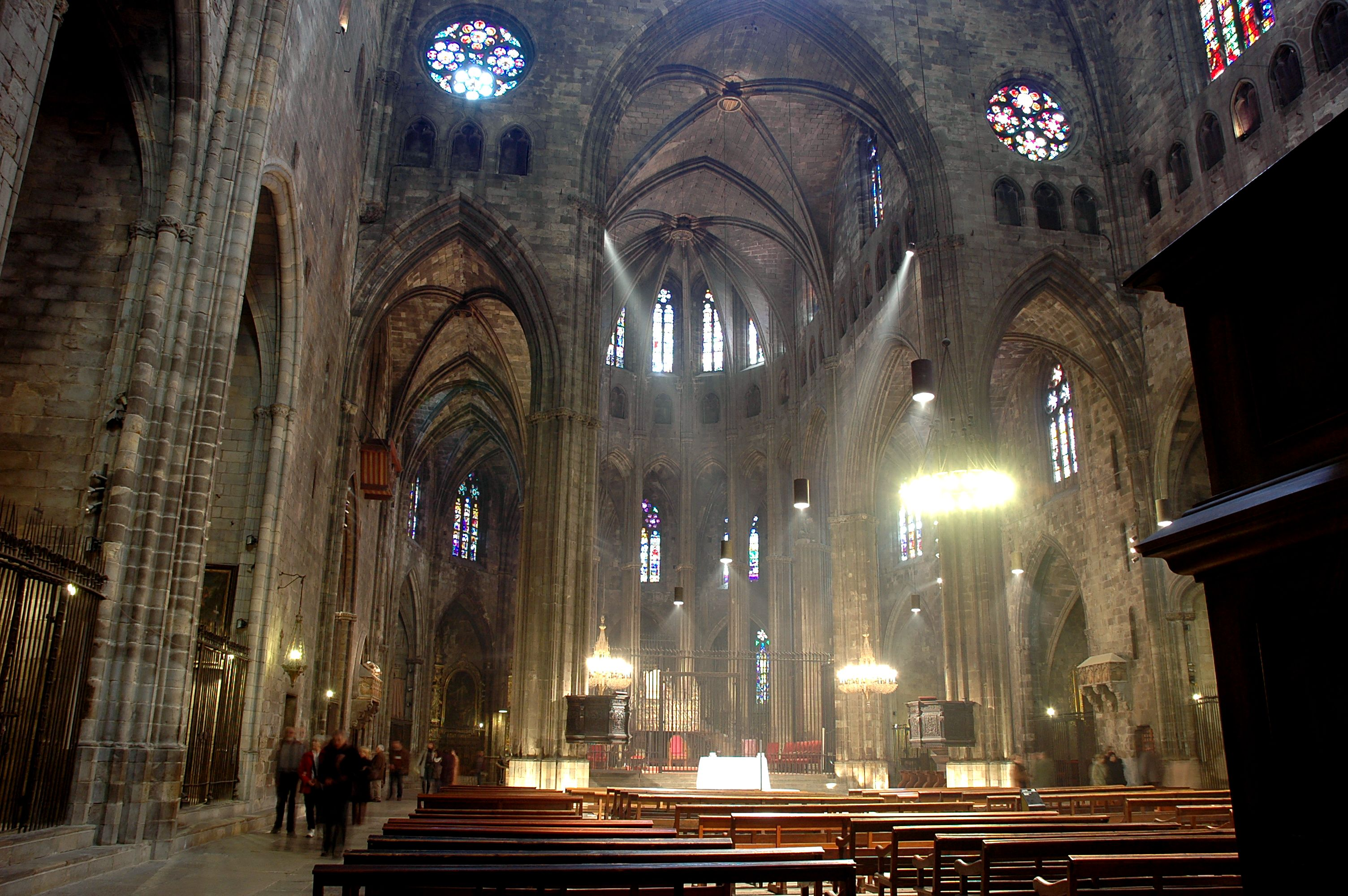
The spacious nave of Girona Cathedral

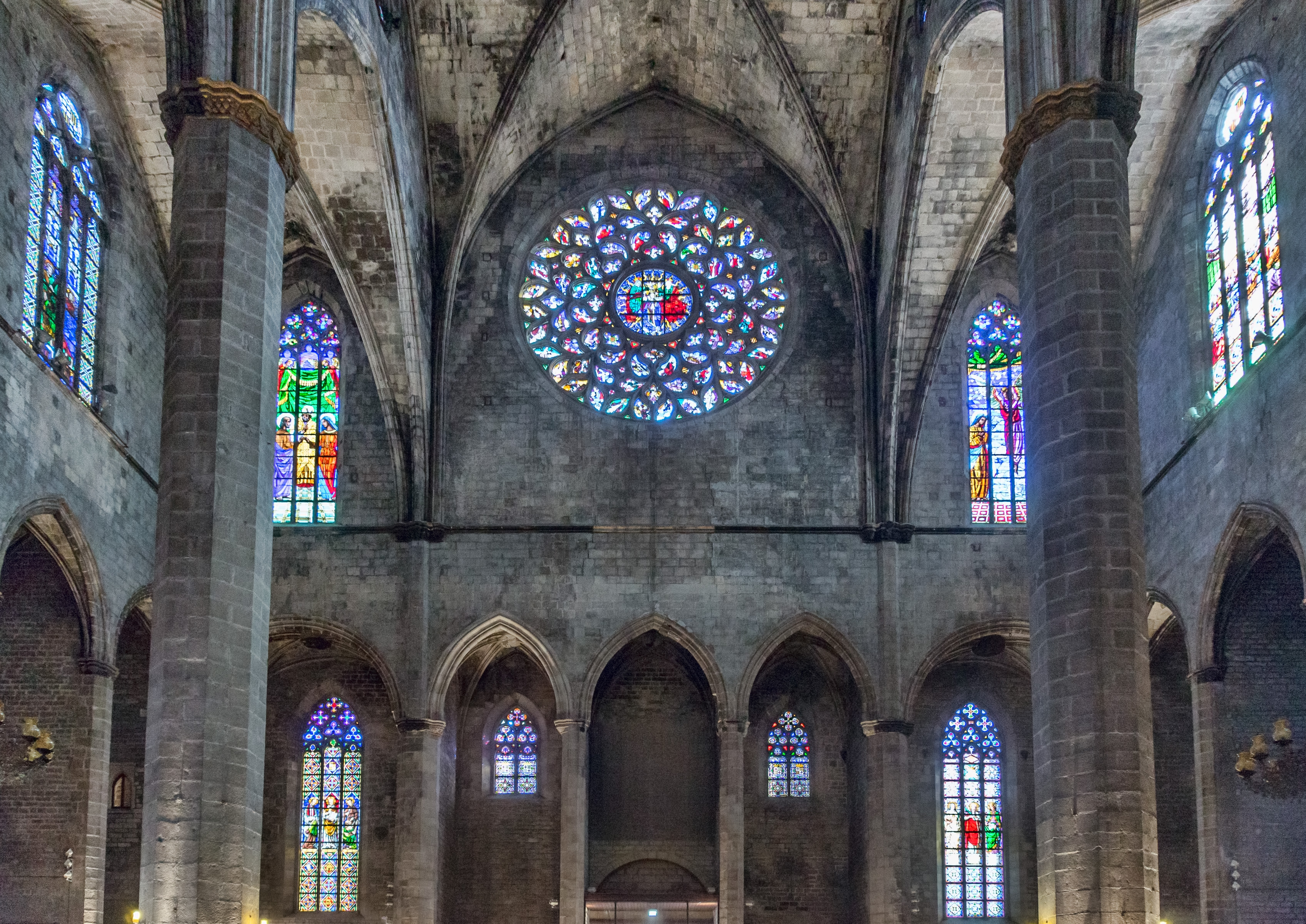
Santa Maria del Mar, westward

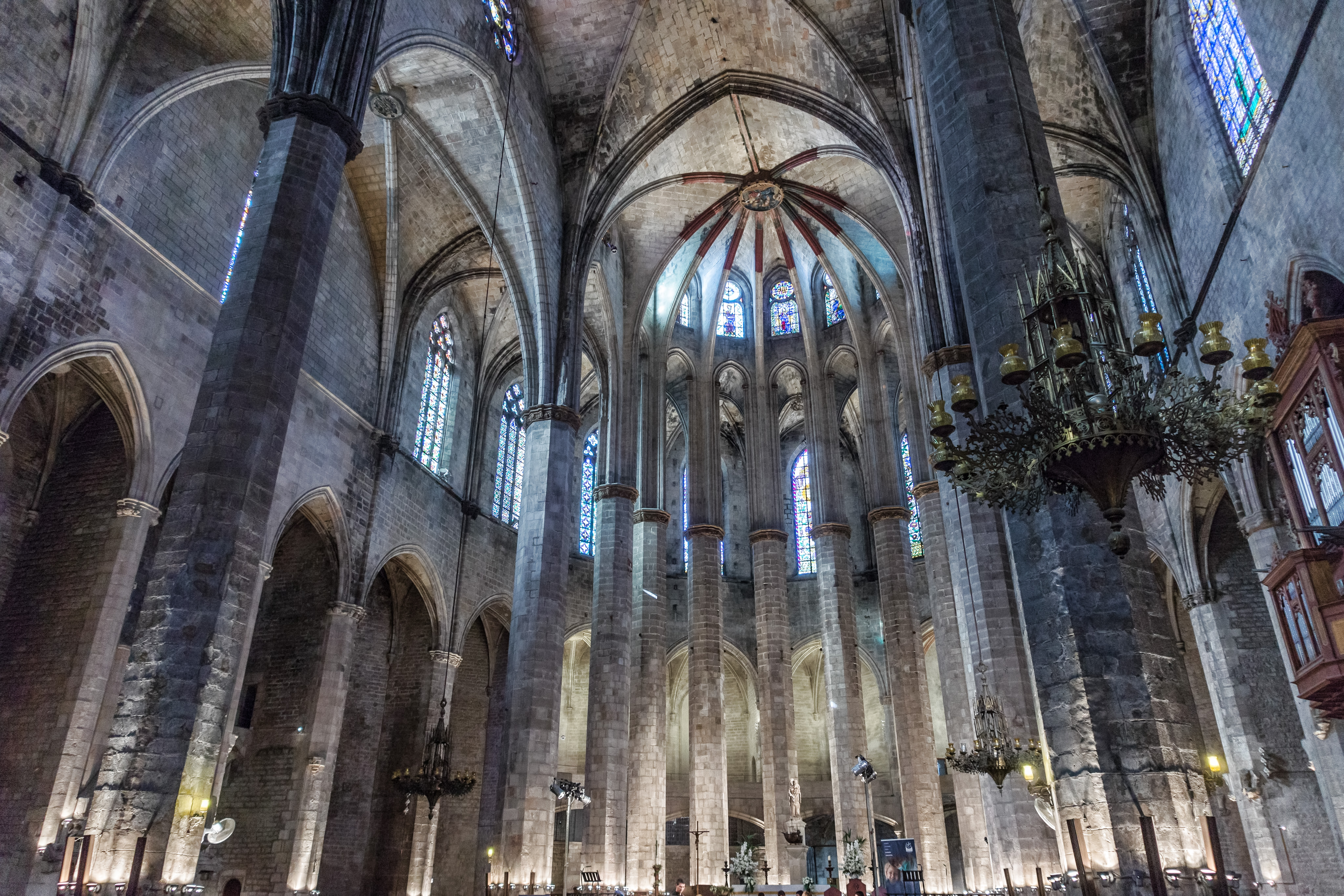
Santa Maria del Mar, eastward

== Italy ==
In most of the Gothic architecture of Italy, northern European forms were applied very selectively. So was the adaption of Rayonnant architecture. Some of the few examples are abbey churches whose orders were active in France and other parts of Europe. But also cathedrals have to be mentioned. The façade of Siena Cathedral was planned in the Rayonnant style, in 1284, though modified in later years. The façade is covered by fine sculpture. The interior was remodeled and vaulted in 1260 and therefore resembles northern Gothic – except of the round arcades and traverse arches. Orvieto Cathedral, begun in 1290 or 1310, has many Gothic but also some Romanesque elements. It is notable for its elaborate two-dimensional decorative patterns on its façade and interiors. Its open trusses emphasize the difference from transalpine Gothic. Both interiors are dominated by polychrome marble. The facade of the bell tower 1334–1358) of Florence Cathedral is decorated with elaborate patterns in the marble, resembling Rayonnant tracery.

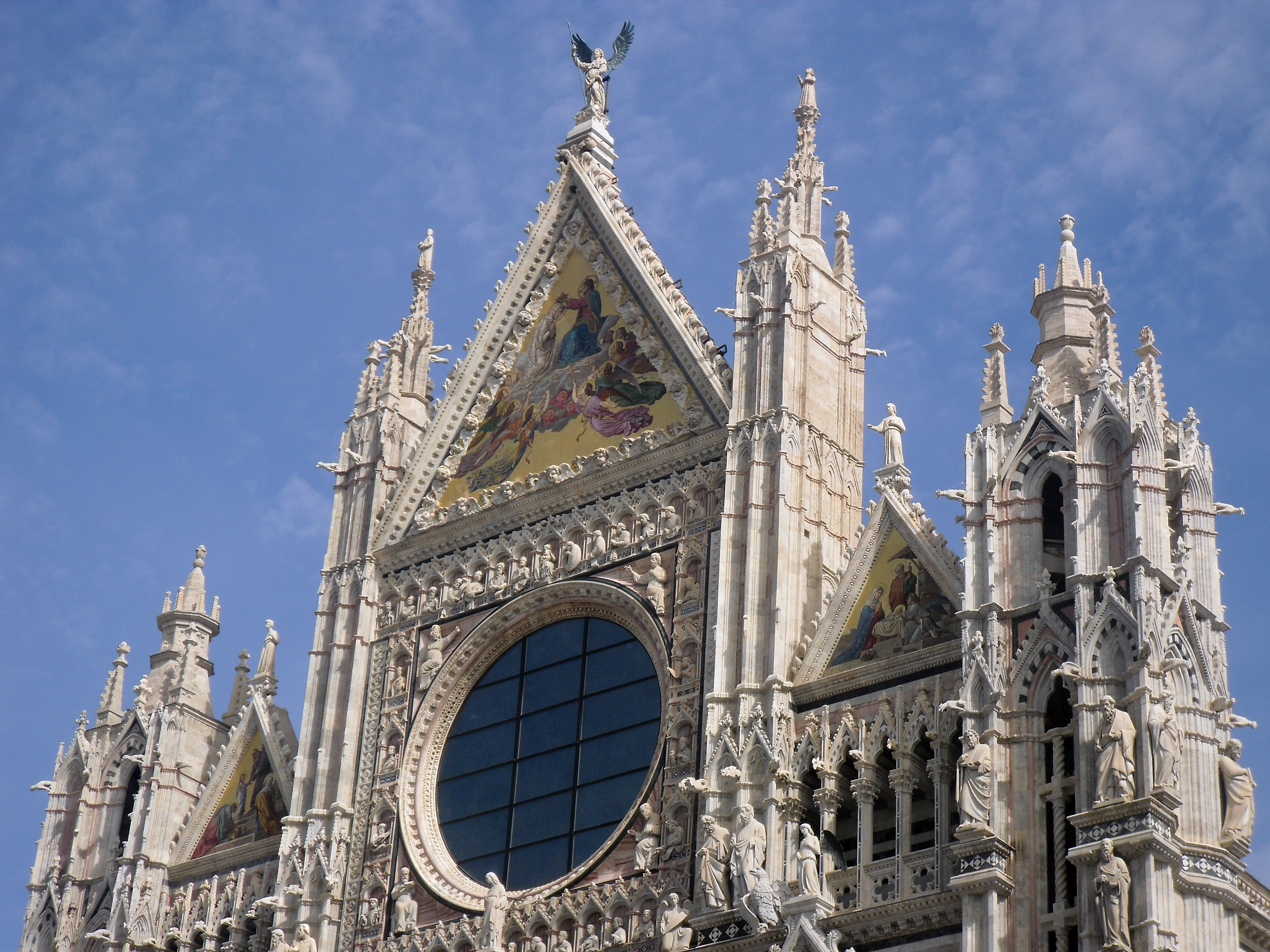
Upper facade of Siena Cathedral, 1215–1264

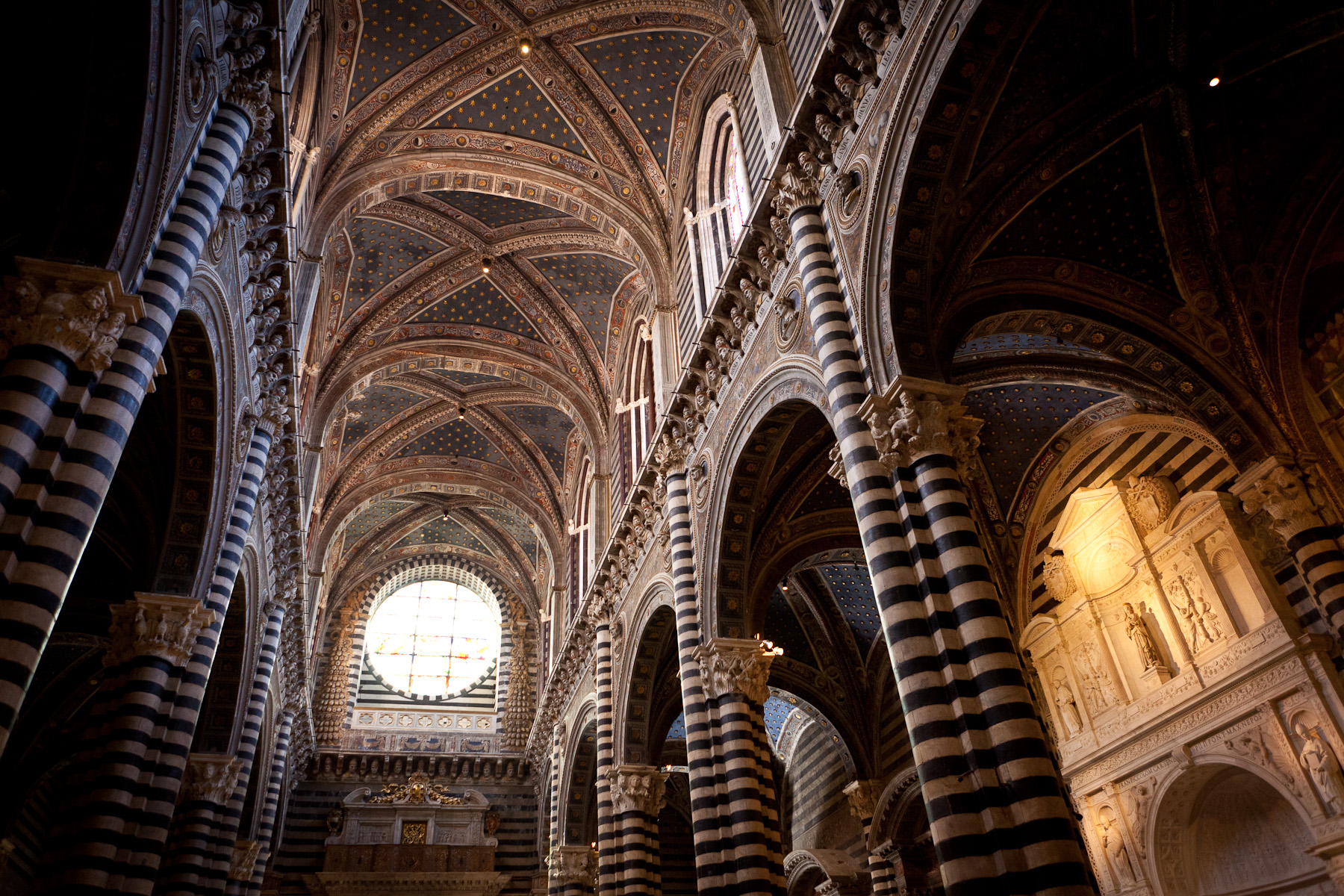
Siena Cathedral, westward

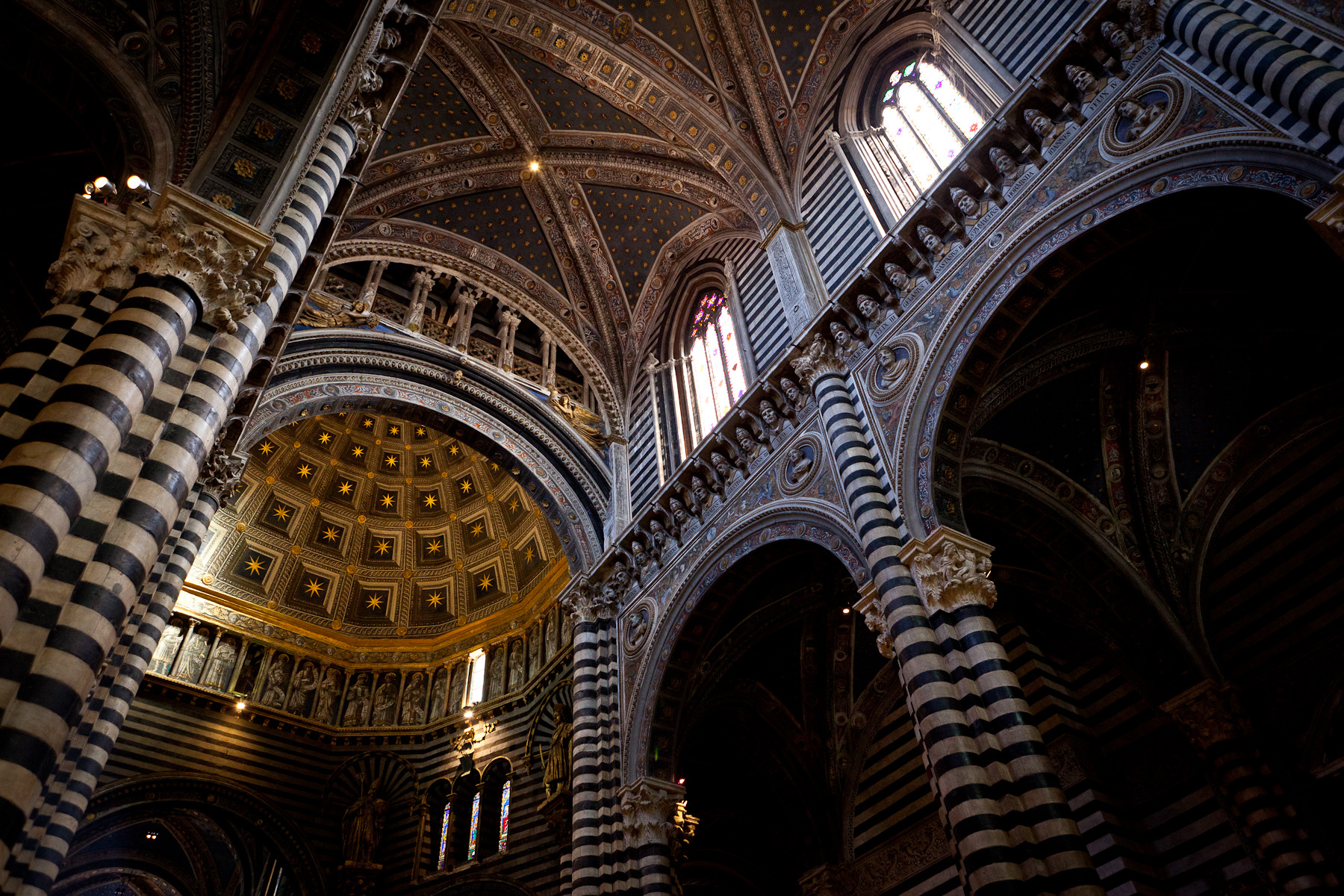
Siena Cathedral, apse and clerestory

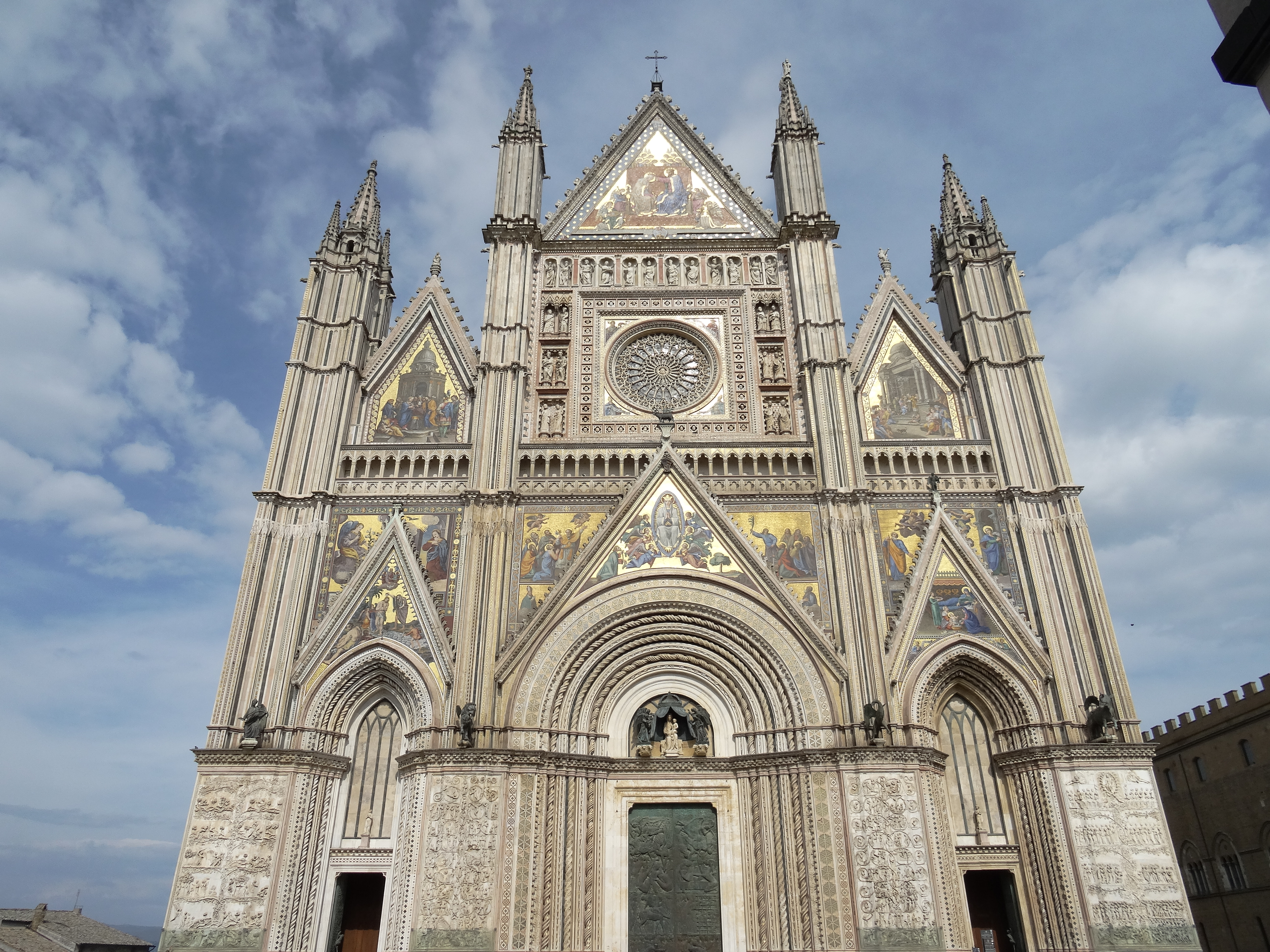
Orvieto Cathedral, begun in 1310

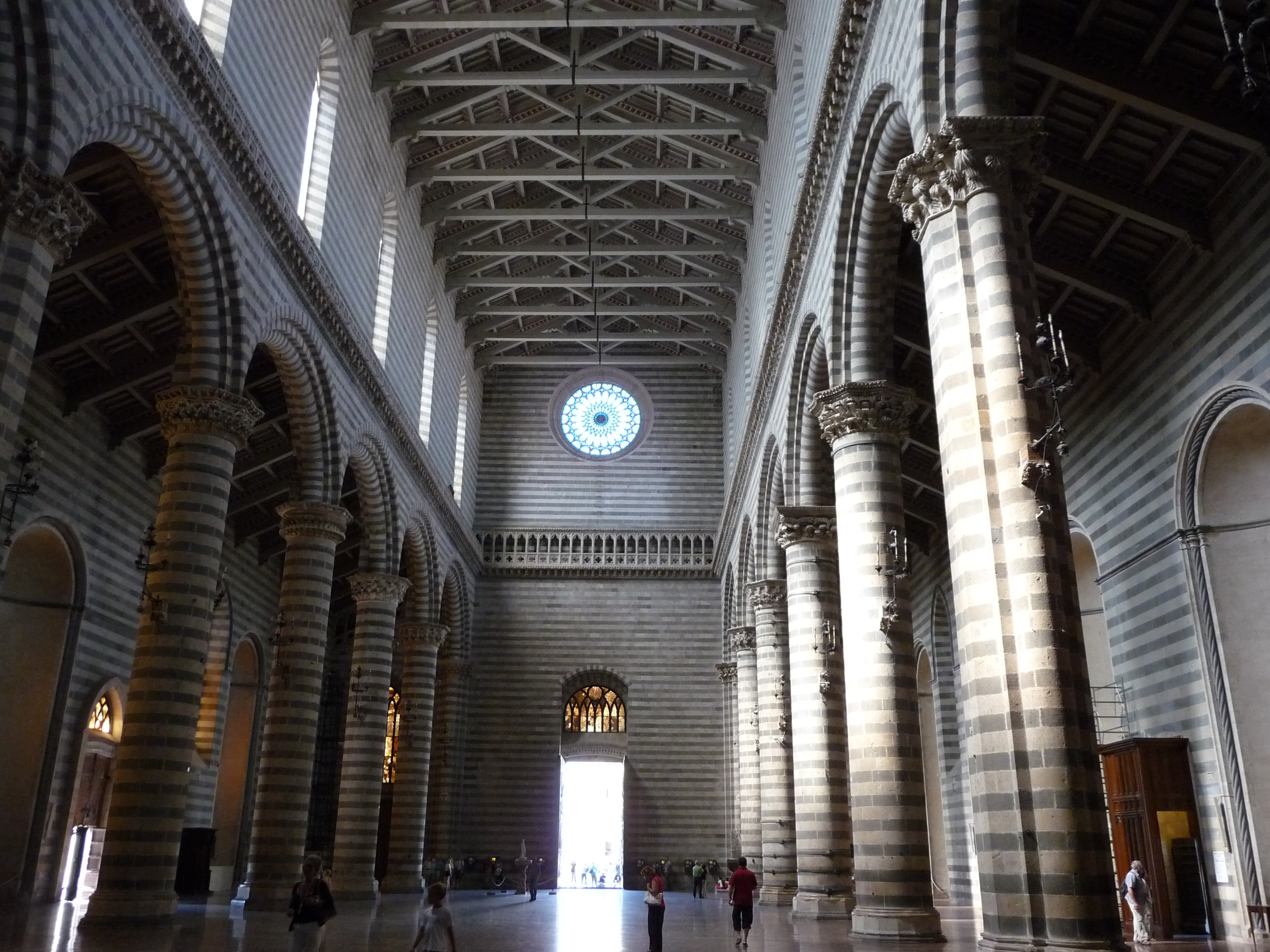
Orvieto Cathedral, westward

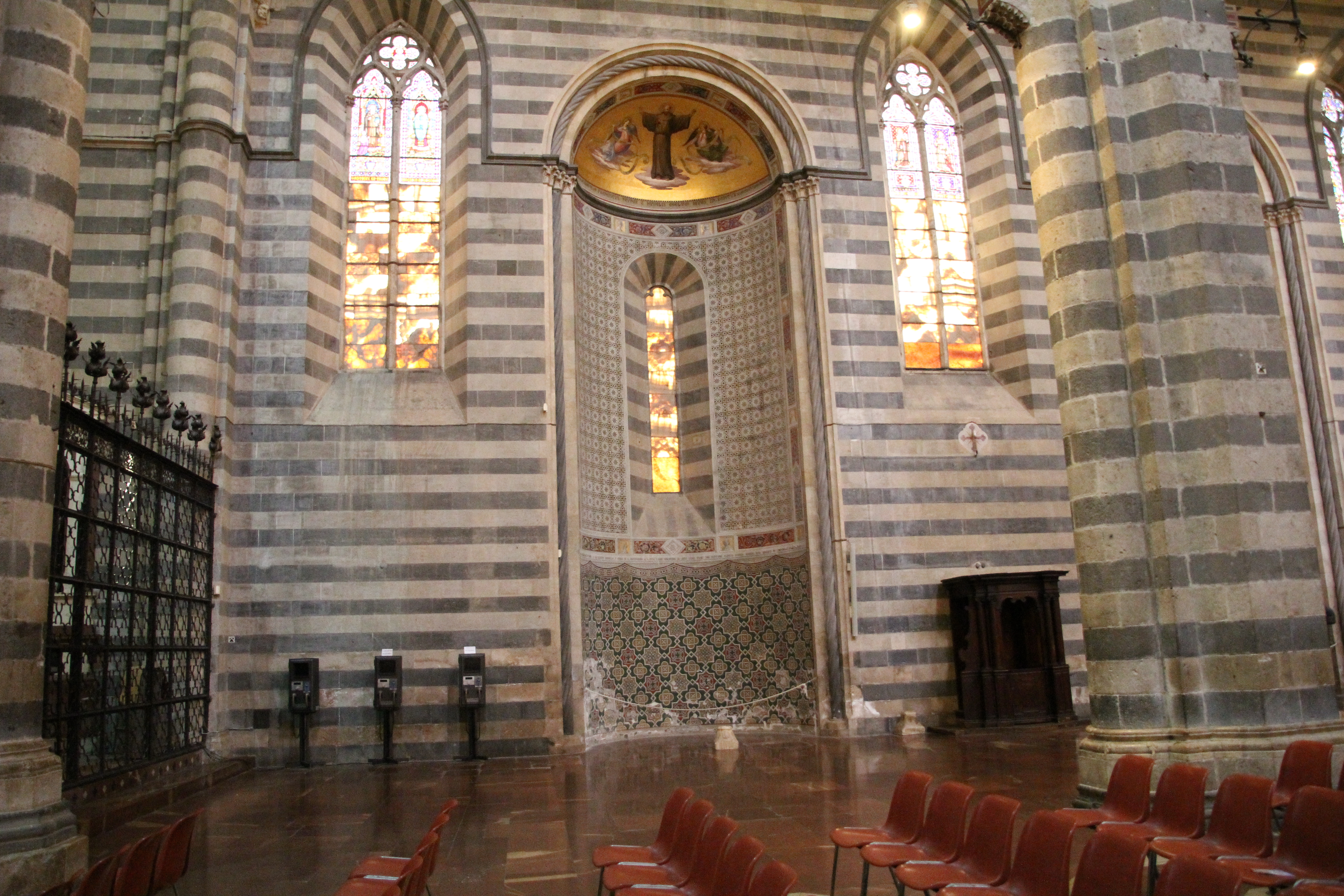
Orvieto Cathedral, traverse view

== Characteristics ==
The distinguishing features of Rayonnant architecture included the greatly increased amount of light in the interior, due to the enlargement of the arcades and especially the increase in the number and size of windows. In distinction from the dark triforia of Classic Gothic, Rayonnant triforia are lit by windows. This became possible by covering the aisles with roofs with own ridges, instead of lean-to roofs. Nevertheless, there was some roll back of this development, see Utrecht Cathedral (younger but with dark triforia) in relation to Cologne Cathedral.

In the layout of stained glass windows, combinations of coloured subjects and uncoloured areas made the presentations more impressive and interiors brighter. The Rayonnant period coincided with the development of the band window, in which a central strip of richly coloured stained glass is positioned between upper and lower bands of clear or frosted glass, which allowed even more light to flood in, and a comparable increase in the amount of ornament, both on the inside and the exterior. This was often achieved by very elaborate designs in the rose windows and the lace-like tracery screens on the exterior to cover the facades and elements like the buttresses.

On the walls, the use of gables, pinnacles and open tracery increased.

=== Façades ===
In the Rayonnant period, the west façades and portals were lavishly decorated with pointed gables, the points of which often included small circular windows, plus an array of sculptured pinnacles and fleurons. Besides serving as a decoration, the pinnacles had a structural function; they added weight to the buttresses, giving greater support to the walls. The standard cathedral façade featured three portals, two towers and a rose window, as it had since Early Gothic times.

The façade of, of St Urbain in Troyes (1262–1389) requires caution. The church remained incomplete in the Middle Ages, and most of the west façade is a work of the 19th century.

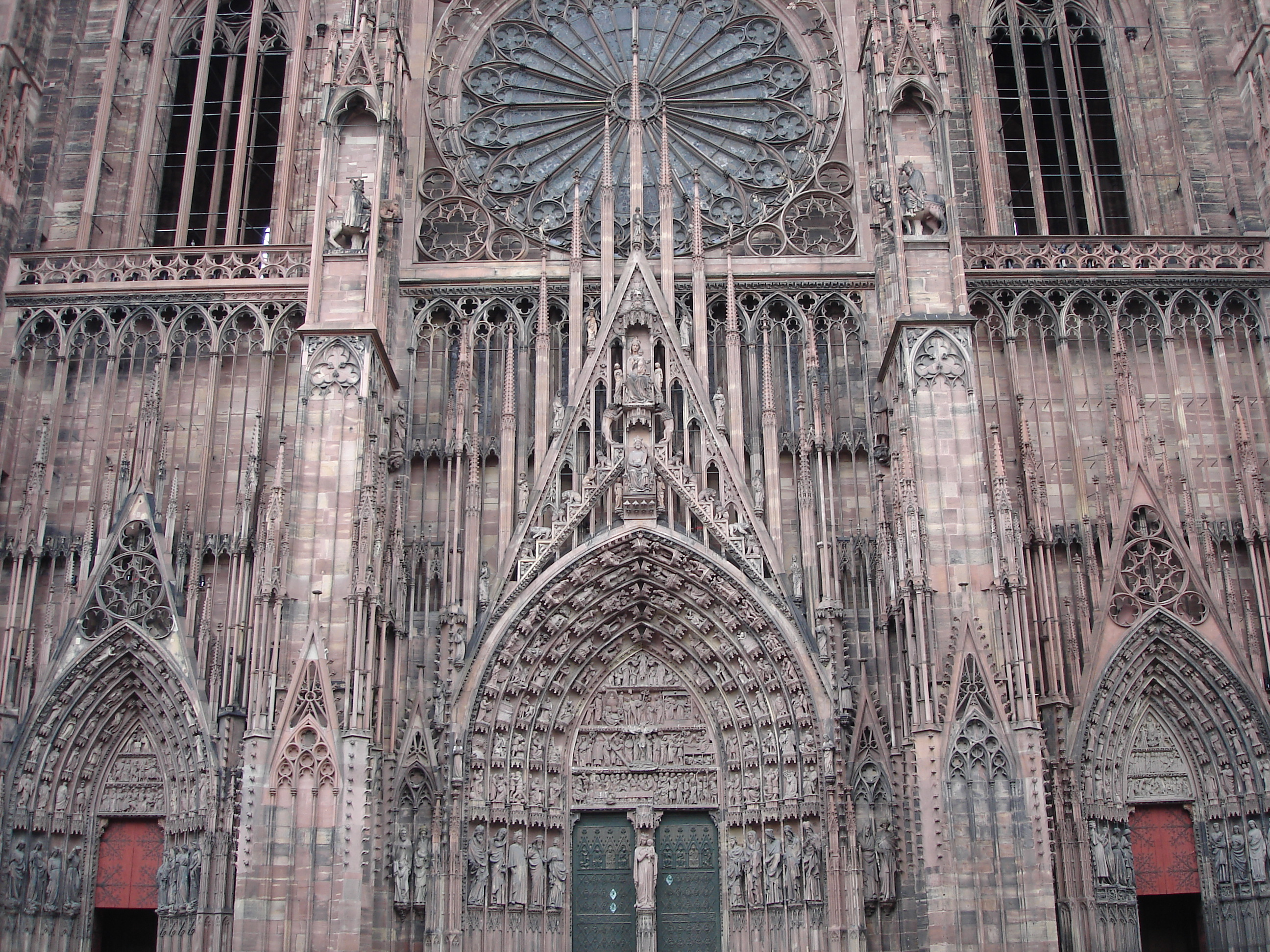
Detail of west façade of Strasbourg Cathedral (1225–1439), in French terms still a façade harmonique – not yet Rayonnant

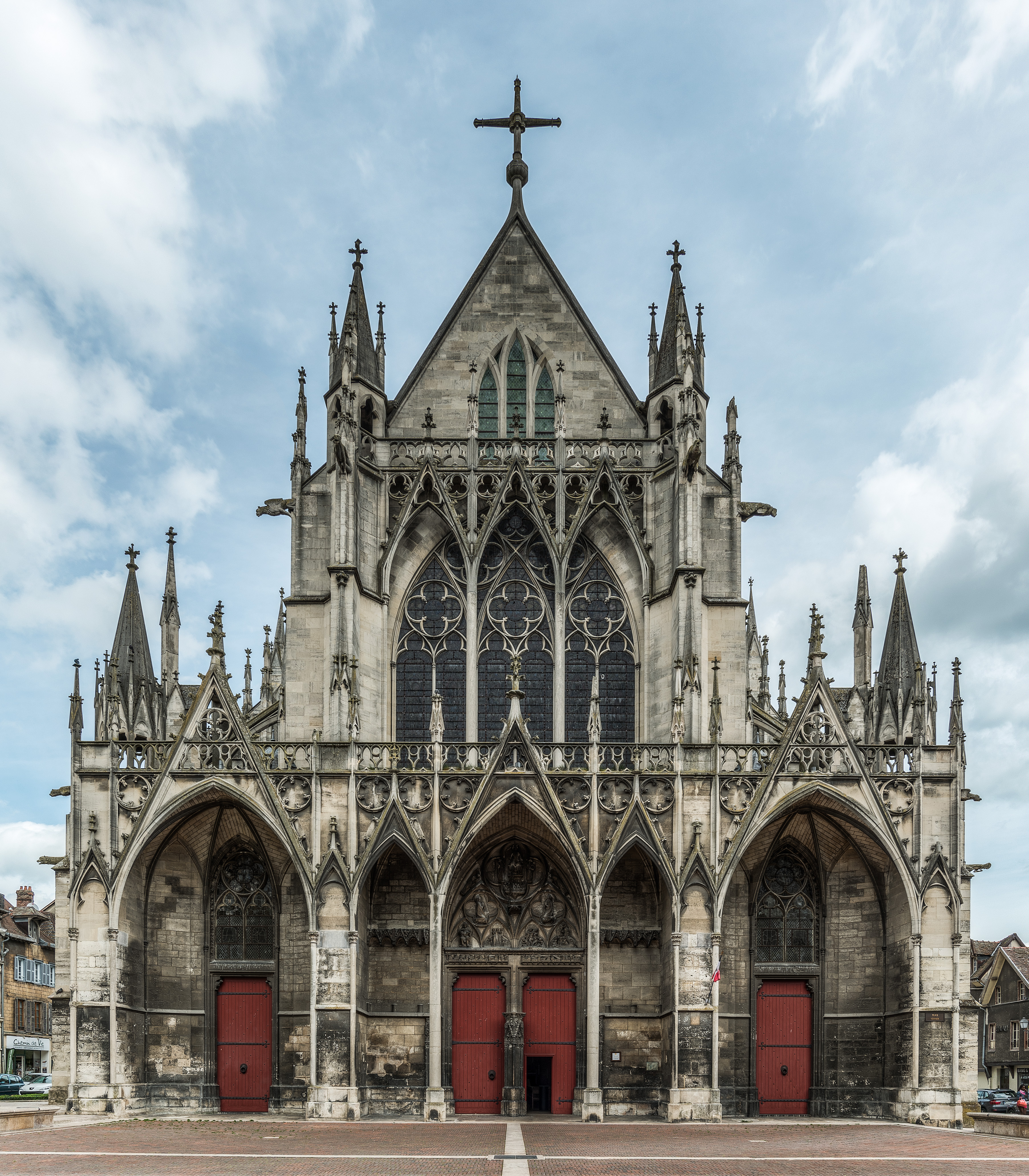
Façade of the Basilica of St Urbain, Troyes today

=== Interior elevations ===
In early Gothic cathedrals, the interior elevation of the nave was divided roughly equally into four stories: the aisle arcades lined the ground floor, above which was a tribune (or matroneum) gallery, which buttressed the thrust of the nave; above that the narrow arcaded triforium which was a passageway which further reinforced the walls; and the clerestory on the top, just below the vaults, which usually had small windows. This changed dramatically in the Rayonnant period. Thanks to more efficient flying buttress and quadripartite rib vaults, walls became higher and thinner, with more space dedicated to the clerestory windows. The height of the aisle arcades also increased, with much larger openings. In prioritising the clerestory and aisle, the tribune level, which was not required for structural integrity, disappeared entirely. The intermediate triforium nearly disappeared, or was itself filled with windows. Most impressive was the change to the top level, the clerestory, supported by longer buttresses; the upper walls were filled with larger and larger windows, until the walls at that level nearly disappeared.

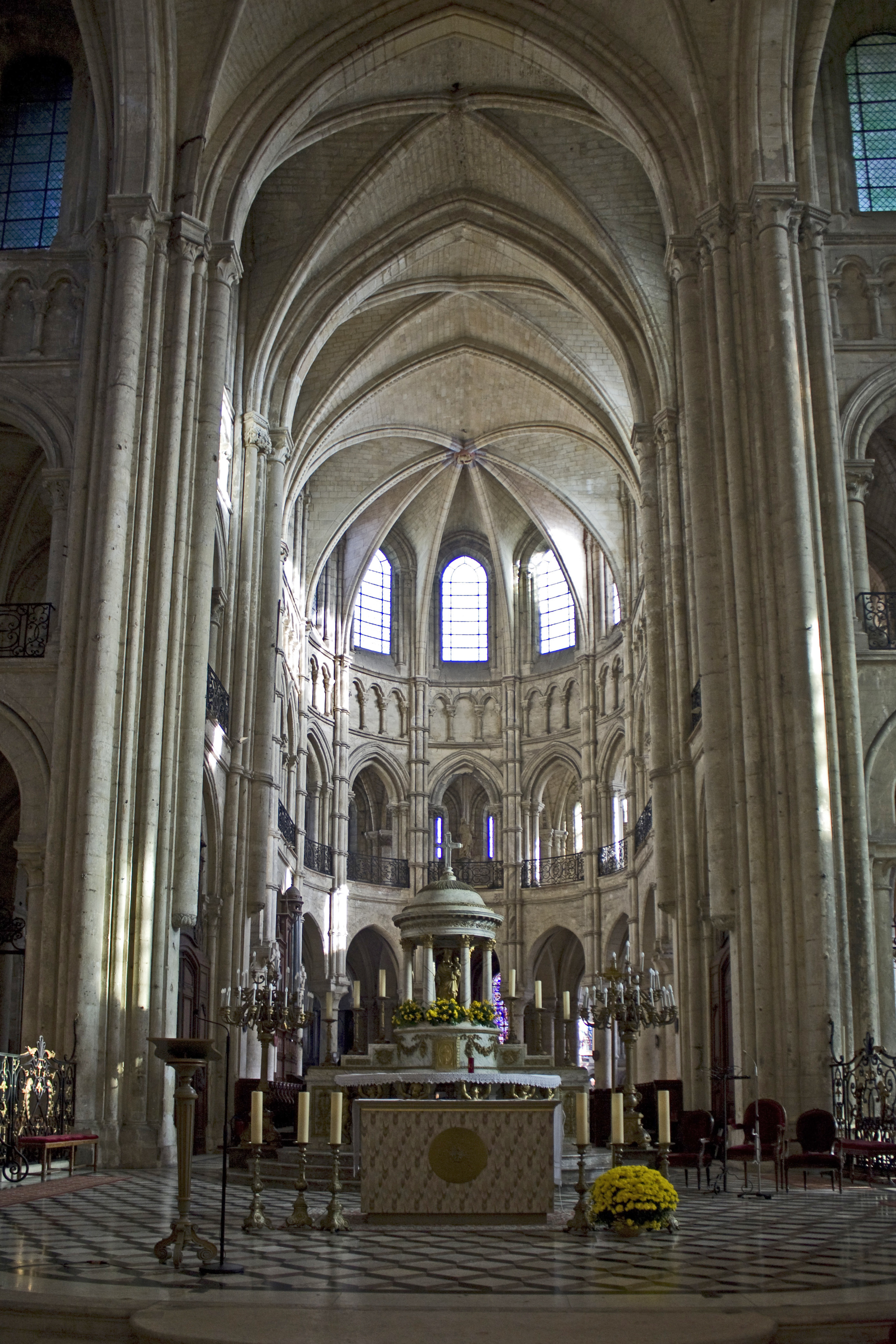
Noyon Cathedral, Primary Gothic: tribune, blind triforium, windows without tracery.

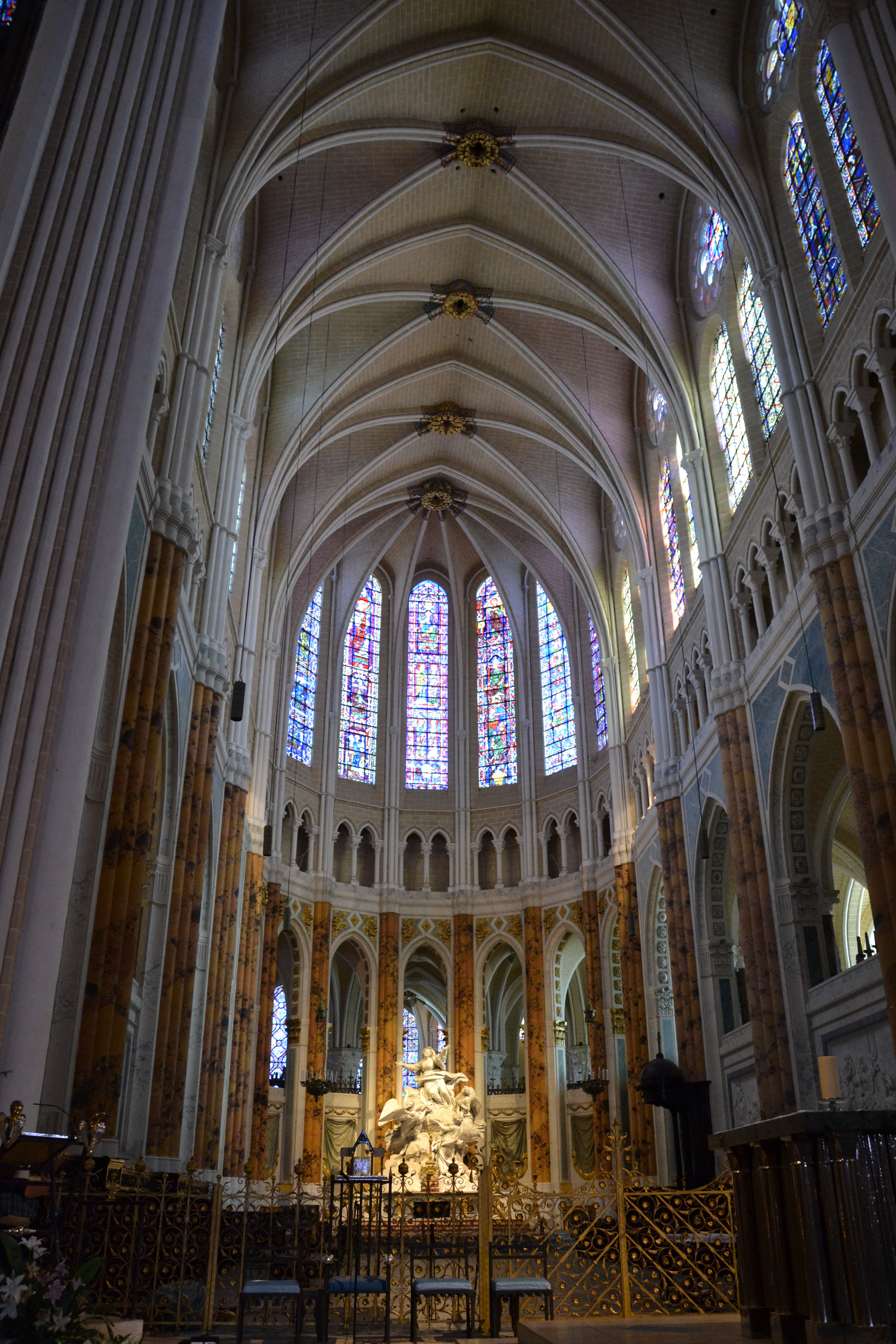
Choir of Chartres Cathedral, Classic Gothic: dark triforium, windows partly without tracery, partly with proto-tracery.

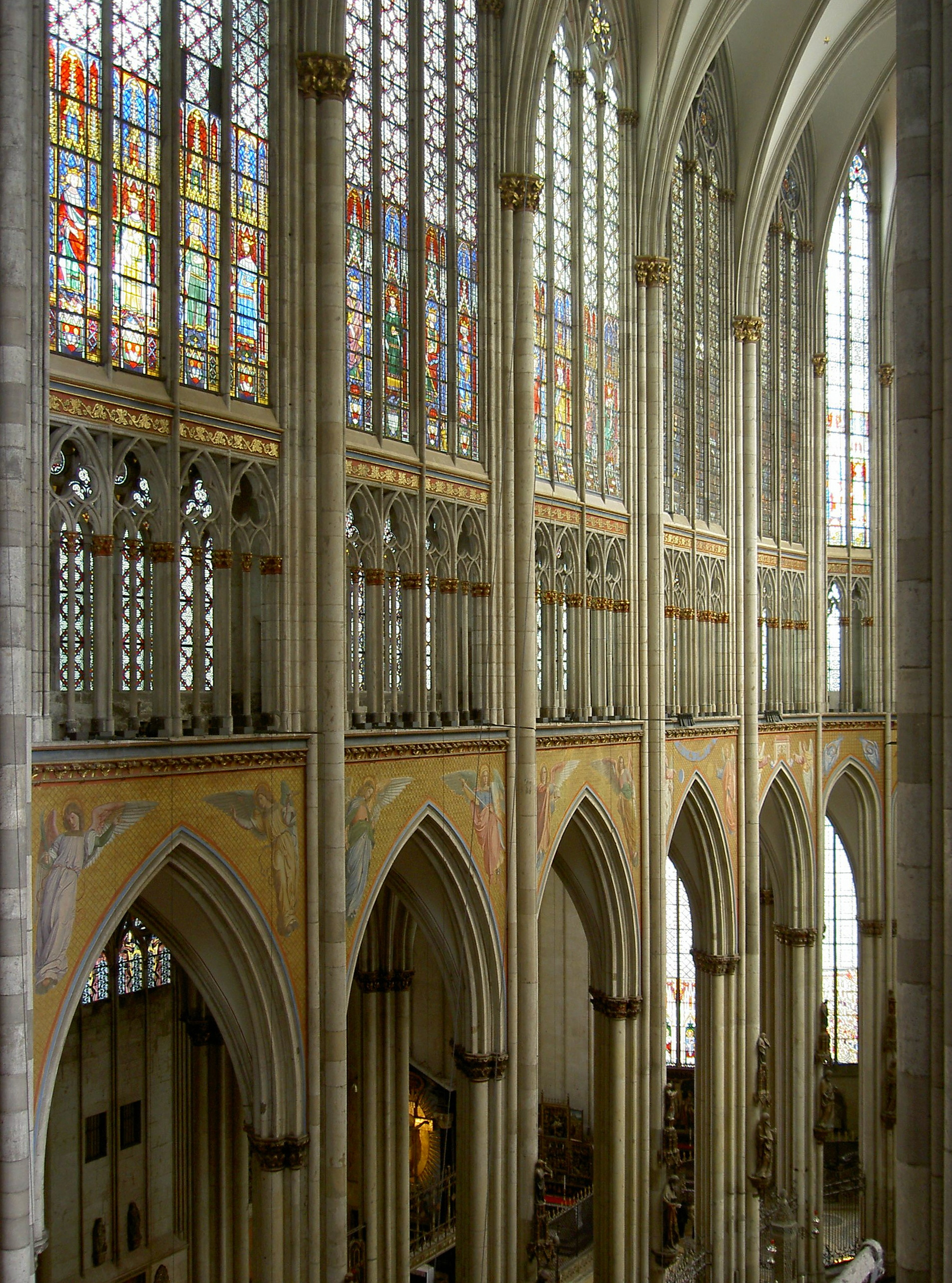
Choir of Cologne Cathedral, Rayonnant: Above the arcades almost all is large windows with fine tracery.

=== Windows ===
Light was a central feature of Rayonnant architecture, meaning windows became much larger, more numerous and more ornate than in earlier styles. In the most ambitious works, windows replaced nearly the entire vertical area defined by each bay and up to the intrados of the vault. This gave rise to increasingly skeletal 'glass cages' which were held together by slender mullions and delicate tracery. In addition, new techniques like silver stain meant that stained glass windows with more varied and brighter colours were made, which, along with the popularity of clearer grisaille glass, also contributed to the brightening of interiors. The shadow and darkness of early Gothic cathedrals, with their small windows and deep, rich colours like Chartres blue, was replaced by a brightly lit space with a full spectrum of coloured light.

Intermediate levels of the walls, such as the triforium, were given windows. At the high level of the clerestory, rows of lancet windows appeared, often topped with tri-lobed or four-part windows and a type of miniature rose windows, called an oculus. This was made possible at Notre-Dame by the construction of a taller and longer kind of flying buttress that made a double leap to support the higher sections of the walls.

There was also a fundamental change in the tracery, or ornamental designs, within windows. Early Gothic windows often used plate-tracery in which the window openings look as if they have been punched out of a flat stone plate. This was replaced by the more delicate bar-tracery in which the stone ribs separating the glass panels are made of narrow carved mouldings, with rounded inner and outer profiles. The elaborate designs of the spokes of the rose windows, radiating outward, gave the name to the Rayonnant style. Bar-tracery probably made its first appearance in the aisle windows at Reims Cathedral and quickly spread across Europe.

A notable architectural innovation that emerged as part of the Rayonnant style in France was the use of glazed triforia. Traditionally, the triforium of an Early or High Gothic cathedral was a dark horizontal band, usually housing a narrow passageway, that separated the top of the arcade from the clerestory. Although it made the interior darker, it was a necessary feature to accommodate the sloping lean-to roofs over the side aisles and chapels. The Rayonnant solution to this, as employed to brilliant effect in the 1230s nave of the Abbey Church of St Denis, was to use double-pitched roofs over the aisles, with hidden gutters to drain off the rainwater. This meant the outer wall of the triforioum passage could now be glazed, and the inner wall reduced to slender bar tracery. Architects also began to emphasise the linkage between triforium and clerestory by extending the central mullions from the windows of the latter in a continuous moulding running from the top of the windows down through the blind tracery of the triforium to the string course at the top of the arcading.

In England, the Rayonnant or Decorated period was characterised by windows of great width and height, divided by mullions into subdivisions, and further elaborated with tracery. Early characteristics were a trefoil or quadrifoil design. Later windows often used an S-shaped curve, called an ogee, giving a flame-like design that heralded the Flamboyant style. Notable examples include the windows in the cloister of Westminster Abbey (1245–69), the Angel Choir of Lincoln Cathedral (1256), and the nave and west front of York Minster (1260–1320).

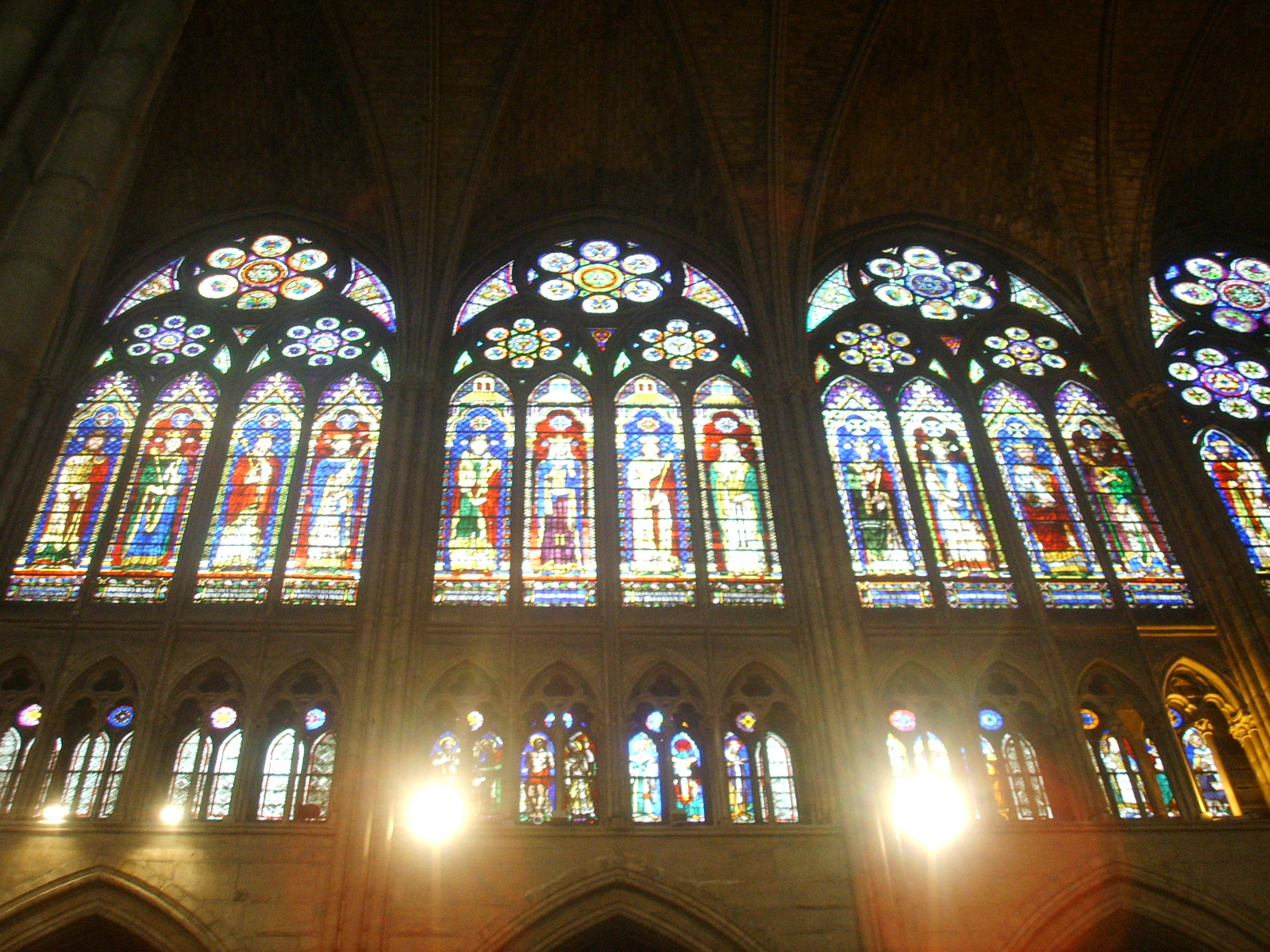
The glazed triforium of the Abbey Church of Saint Denis (1230s)

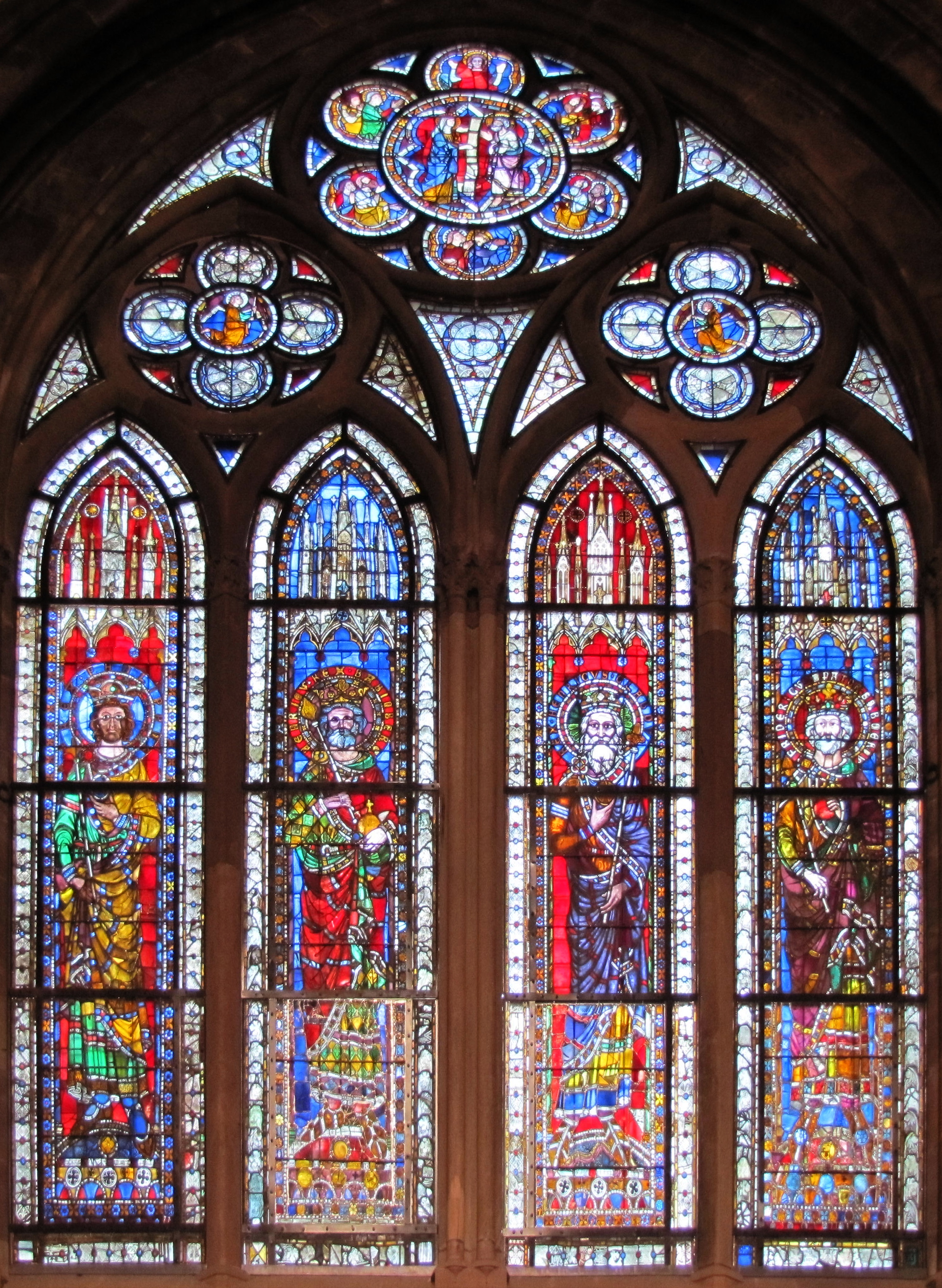
Emperor Window of Strasbourg Cathedral

'Glass cage' with grisaille at Saint-Martin-aux-Bois (completed 1260)

=== Rose windows ===
The great rose window was among the most distinctive elements of the Rayonnant. The transepts of Notre-Dame de Paris were rebuilt to make a place for two enormous rose windows, made by Jean de Chelles and Pierre de Montreuil, and paid for by King Louis IX. Similar great roses were added to the nave of the Basilica of Saint-Denis and Amiens Cathedral. With the use of stone mullions separating the pieces of glass, and those glass pieces supported by lead ribs, windows became stronger and larger, able to resist strong winds. Rayonnant rose windows reached a diameter of ten meters.

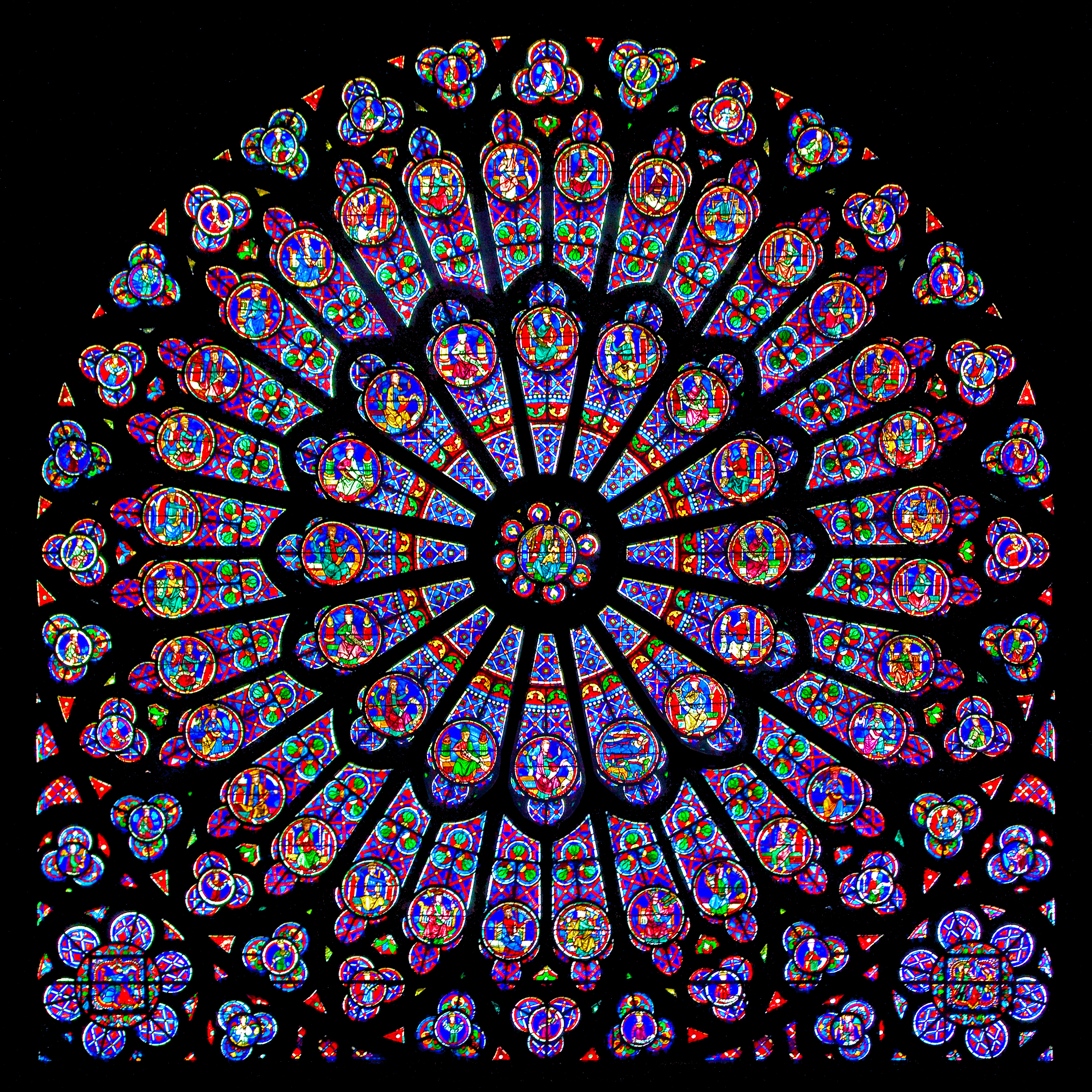
Notre-Dame de Paris, north rose window (1250s), typically Rayonnant: the glass area exceeds the round shape of the rose structure.

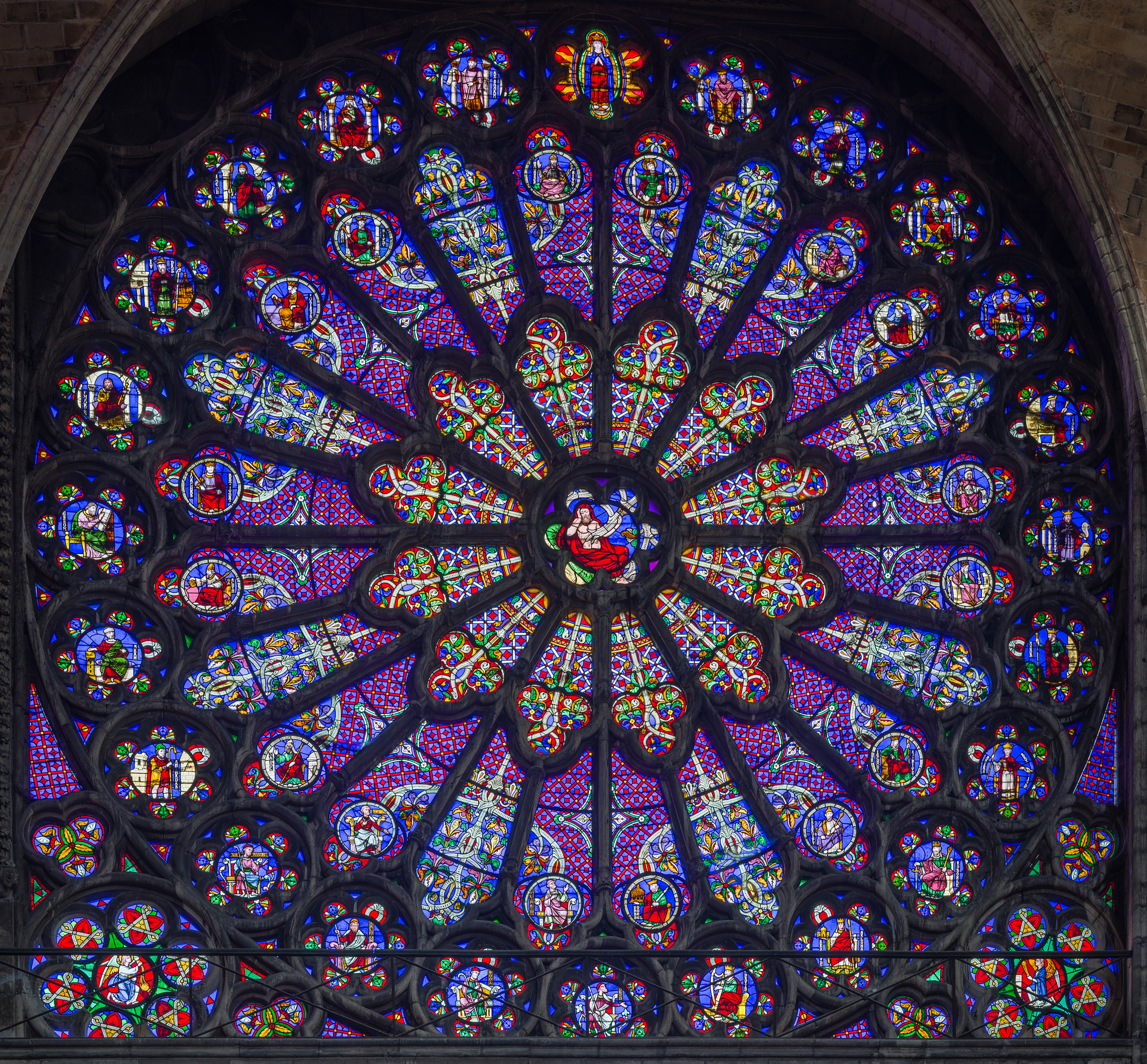
Rose window at the Basilica of Saint-Denis.

=== Blind tracery ===
The tracery within windows inspired another form of Rayonnant decoration; the use of blind tracery, or meshes of thin ribs that could be used to cover blank walls in decorative designs, matching the designs within the windows.

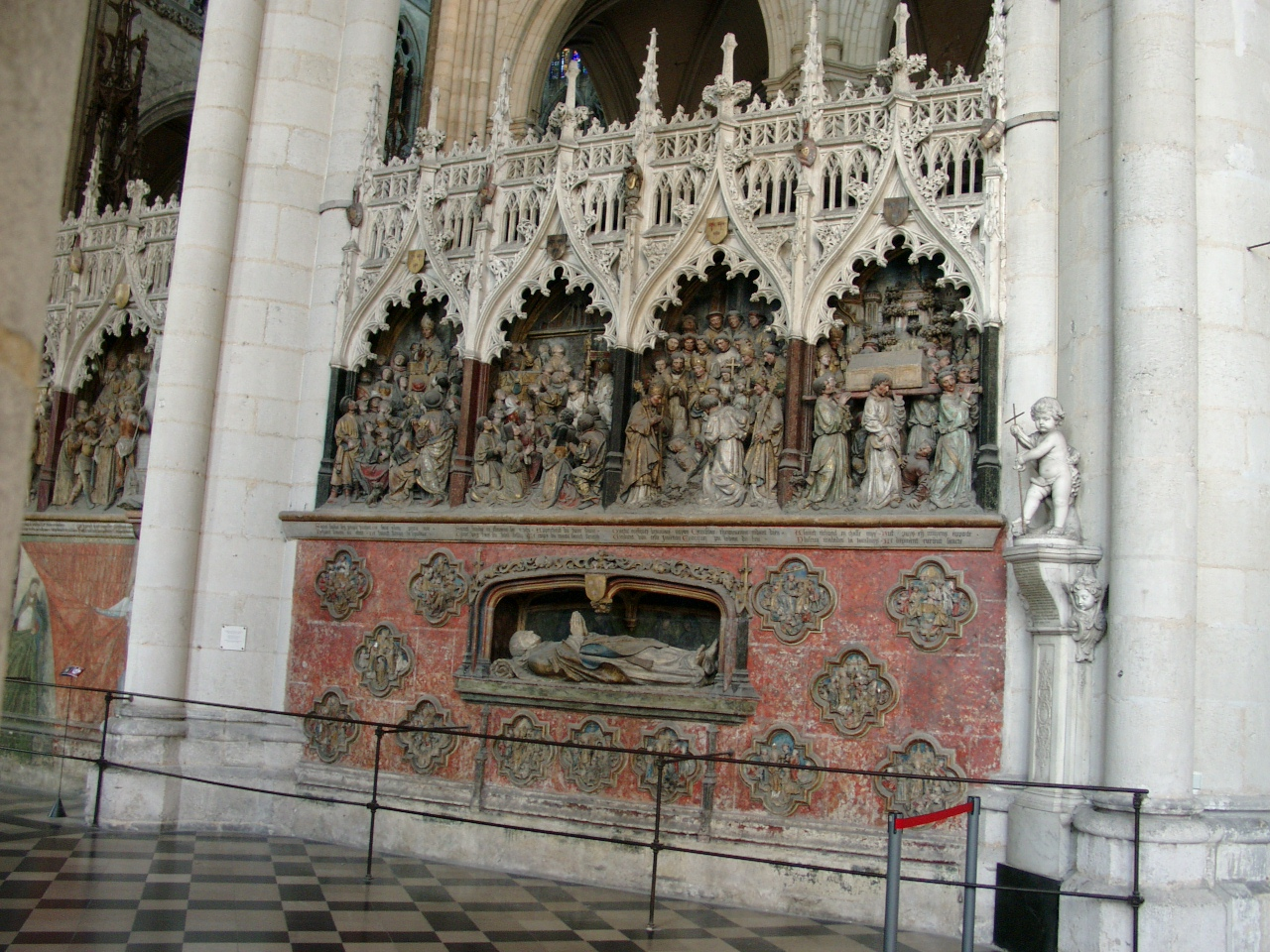
Lateral choir screens of Amiens Cathedral, after 1236, pierced tracery and high relief sculpture

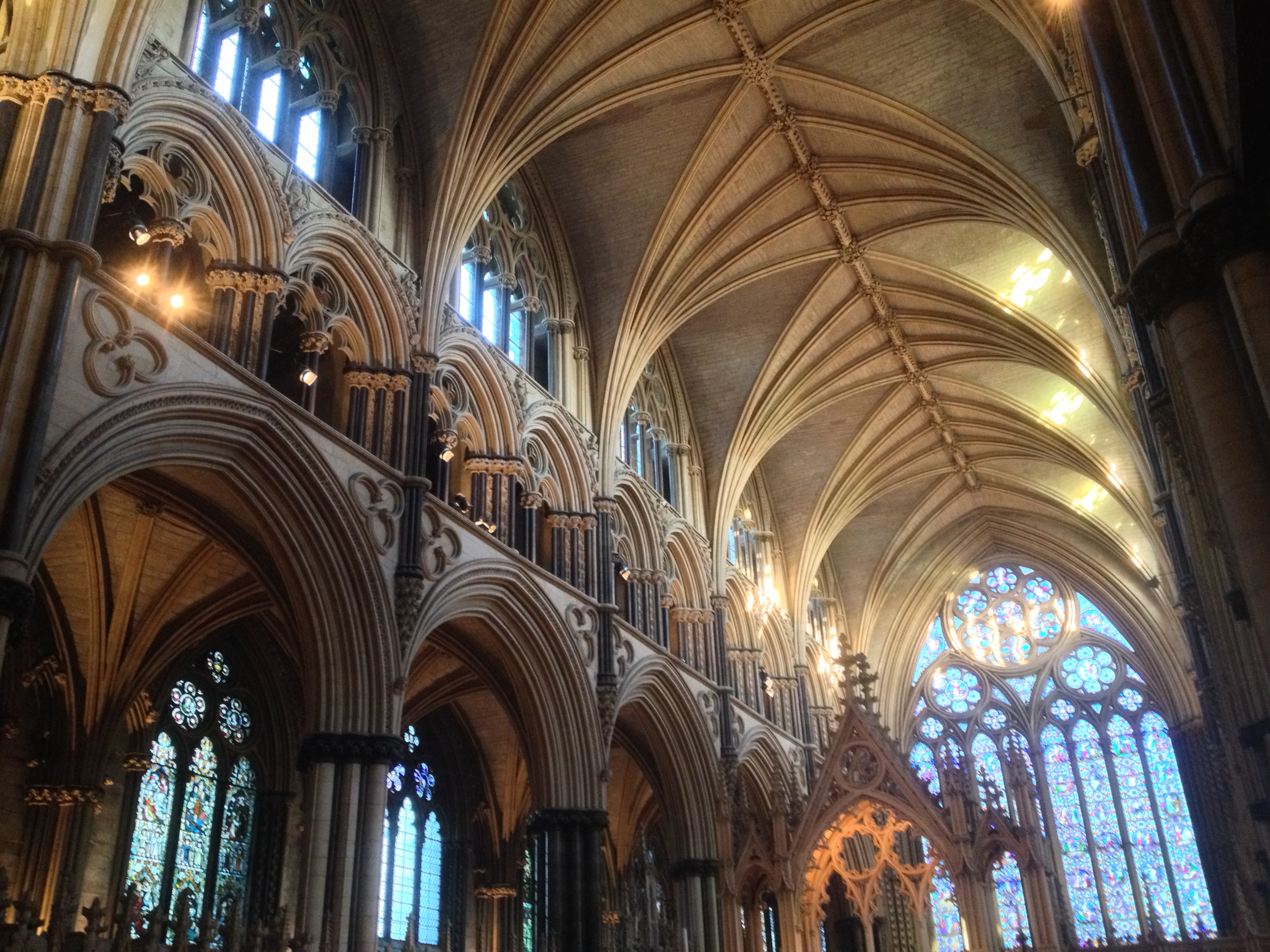
Lincoln Cathedral, Angel Choir, 2nd half of C 13, blind tracery below a dark triforium

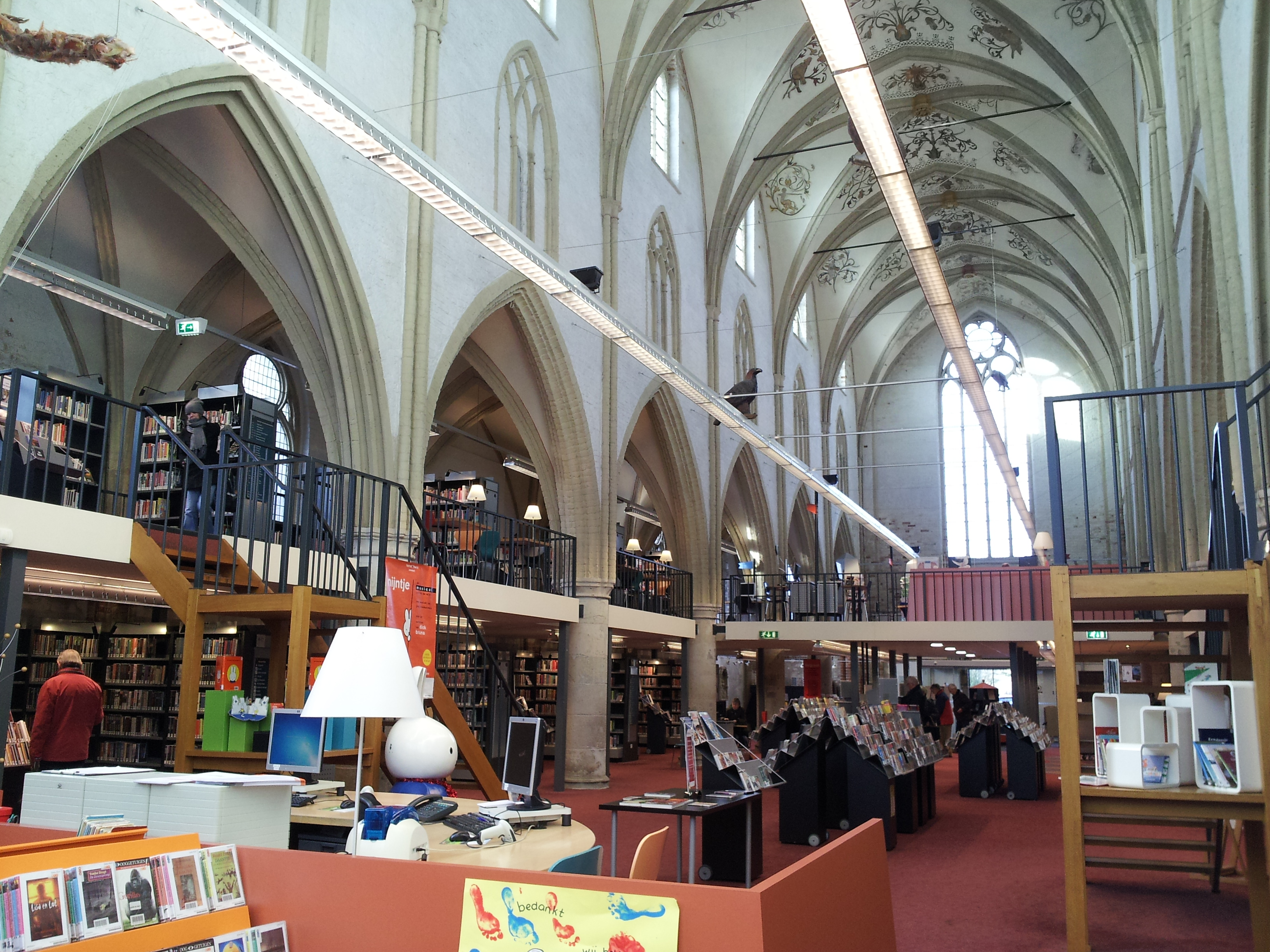
Broederenkerk, Zutphen, blind tracery instead of lit triforium, about 1300

=== Sculpture ===
Sculpture was an important feature of the decoration of the façades of cathedrals, a practice dating back to the Romanesque period. Stone figures of saints and the Holy family were featured on the façade and tympanum. In the Rayonnant period, the sculptures became more naturalistic and three-dimensional, standing out in their own niches across the façade. They had individual facial characteristics, natural gestures and postures, and finely-sculpted costumes. The other decorative sculpture, such as the leaves and plants that decorated the capitals of columns, also became more realistic.

The sculptural decoration of Italian Gothic churches, such as the façade of Orvieto Cathedral, designed by Lorenzo Maitani (1310) was extremely fine, and was part of a combination of bronze and marble figures, mosaics, and polychrome reliefs. It was a forecast of the Renaissance that was about to begin.

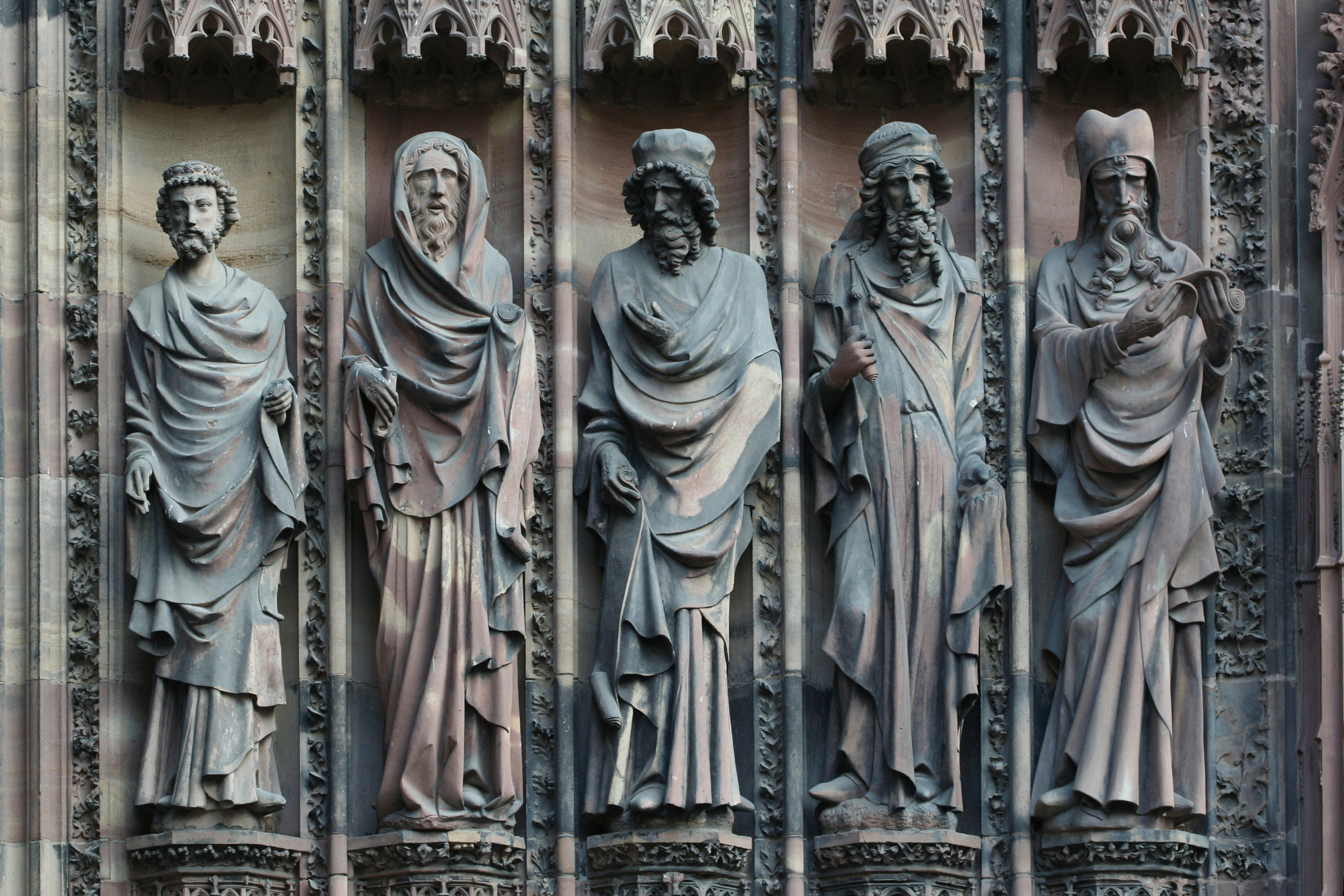
Naturalistic figures of Saints over west portal of Strasbourg Cathedral

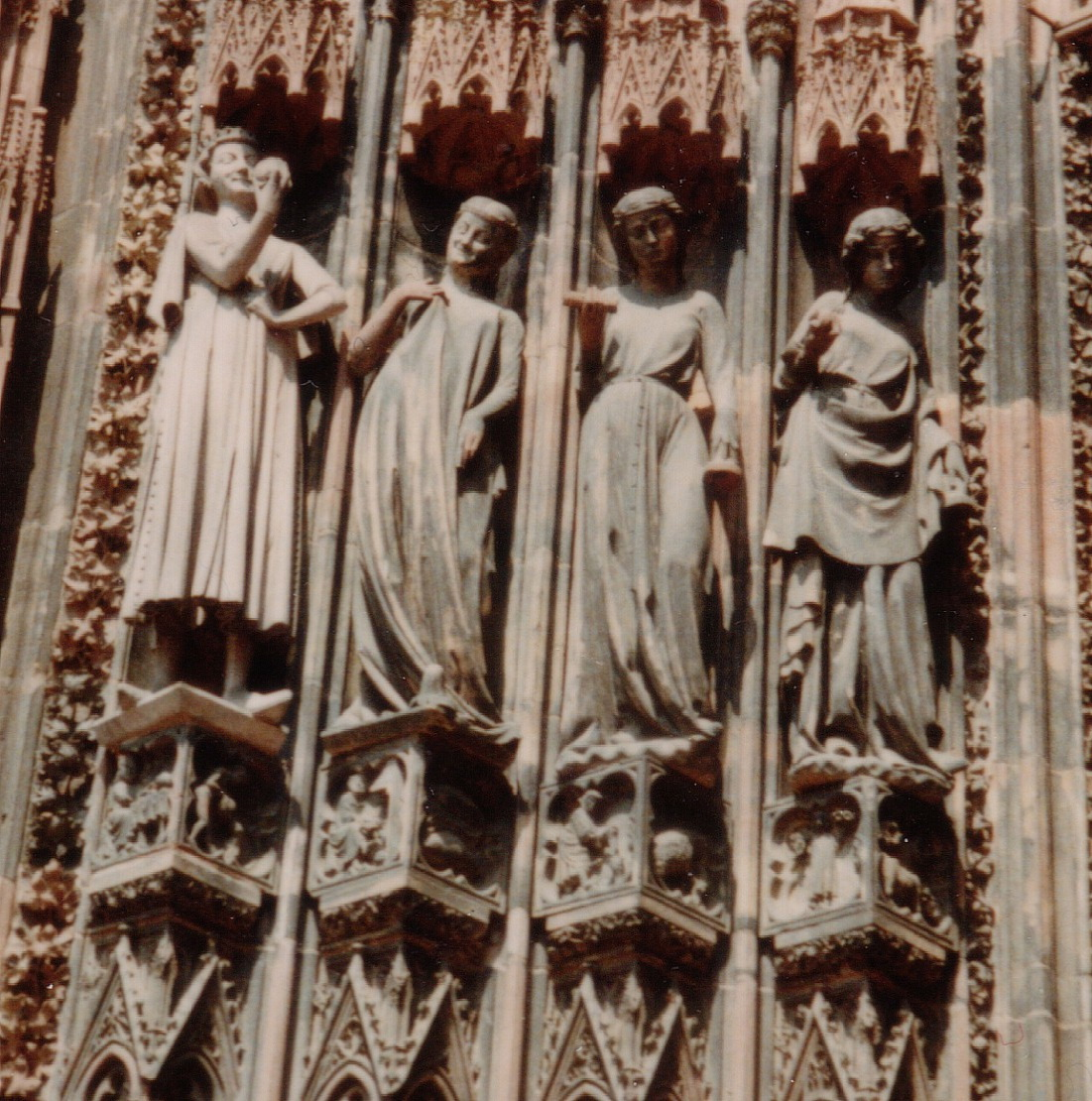
The Tempter and the Foolish Virgins, Strasbourg Cathedral, West Front.

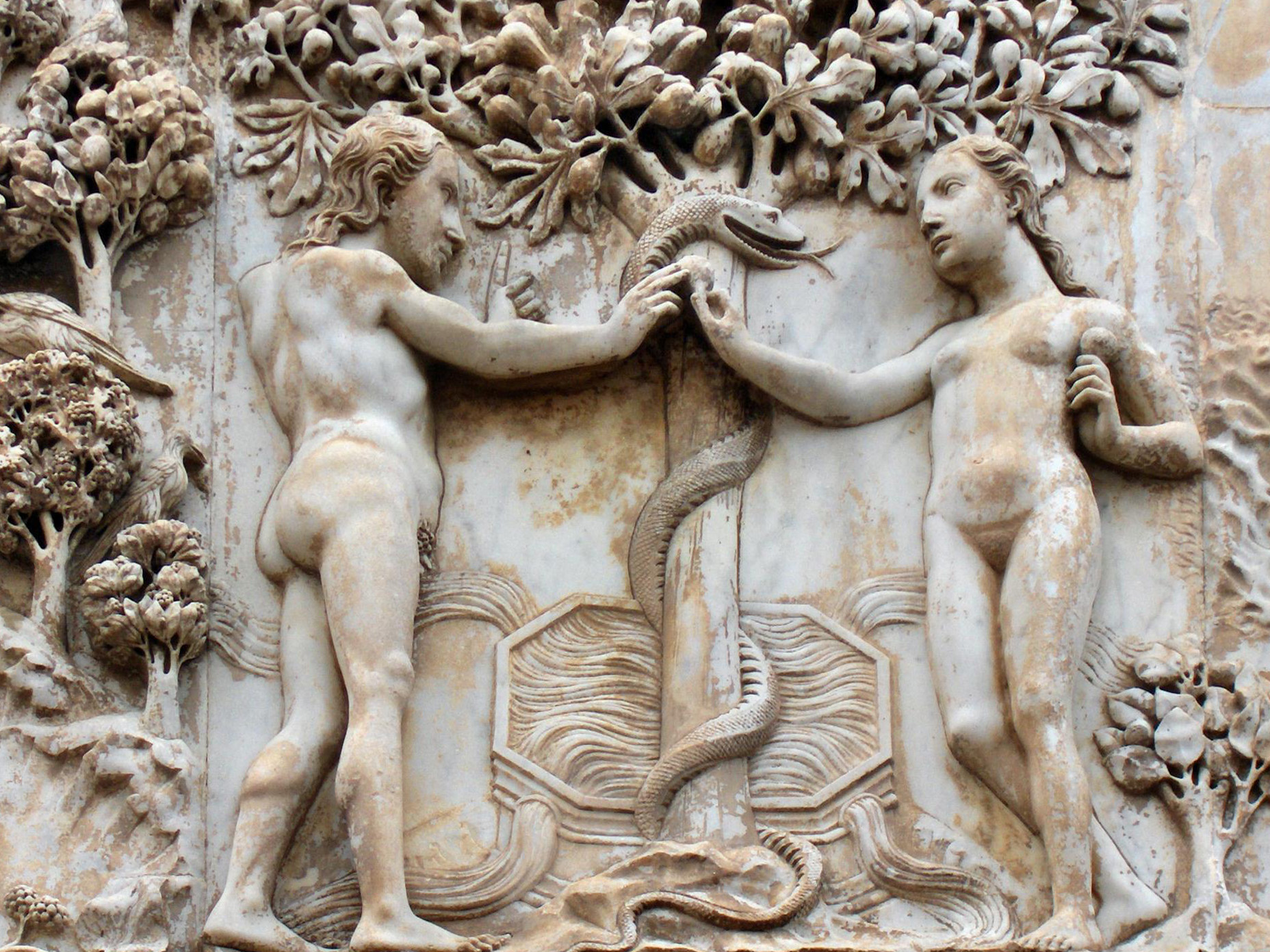
Adam and Eve Sculpture on facade of Orvieto Cathedral by Lorenzo Maitani, (begun 1310)

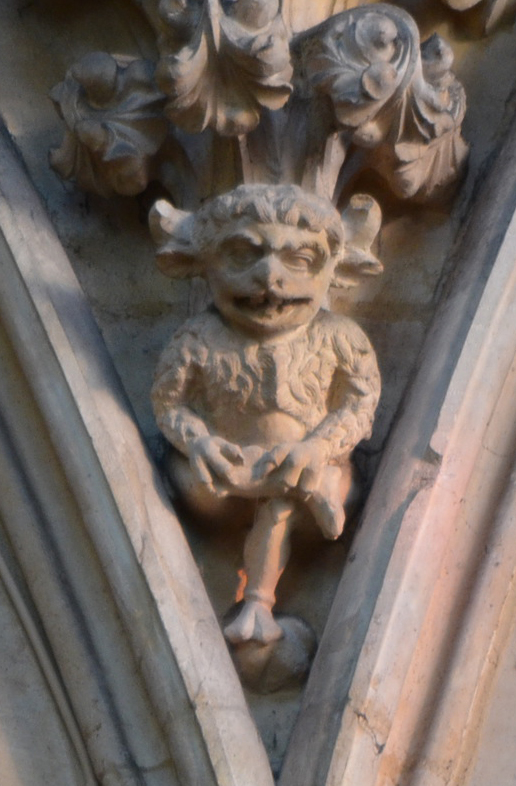
Statuary could also be irreverent - the Lincoln Imp perches in a spandrel of the Angel Choir.

=== Decorative elements ===
One distinctive element of Rayonnant was the use of carved stone decorative elements on the exterior and interior. These included the fleuron, the pinnacle, and the finial, which gave greater height to everything from doorways to buttress. These elements usually also had a practical purpose; they were often added to external structures, such as buttresses, to give them additional weight.

These elements included the crocket, in the form of a stylized carving of curled leaves, buds or flowers which are used at regular intervals to decorate the sloping edges of spires, finials, pinnacles, and wimpergs.

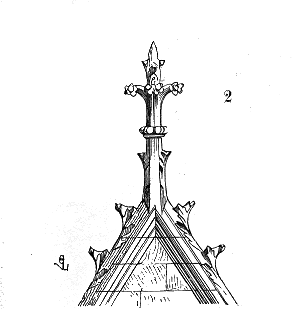
13th century Fleuron illustrated by Viollet-le-Duc

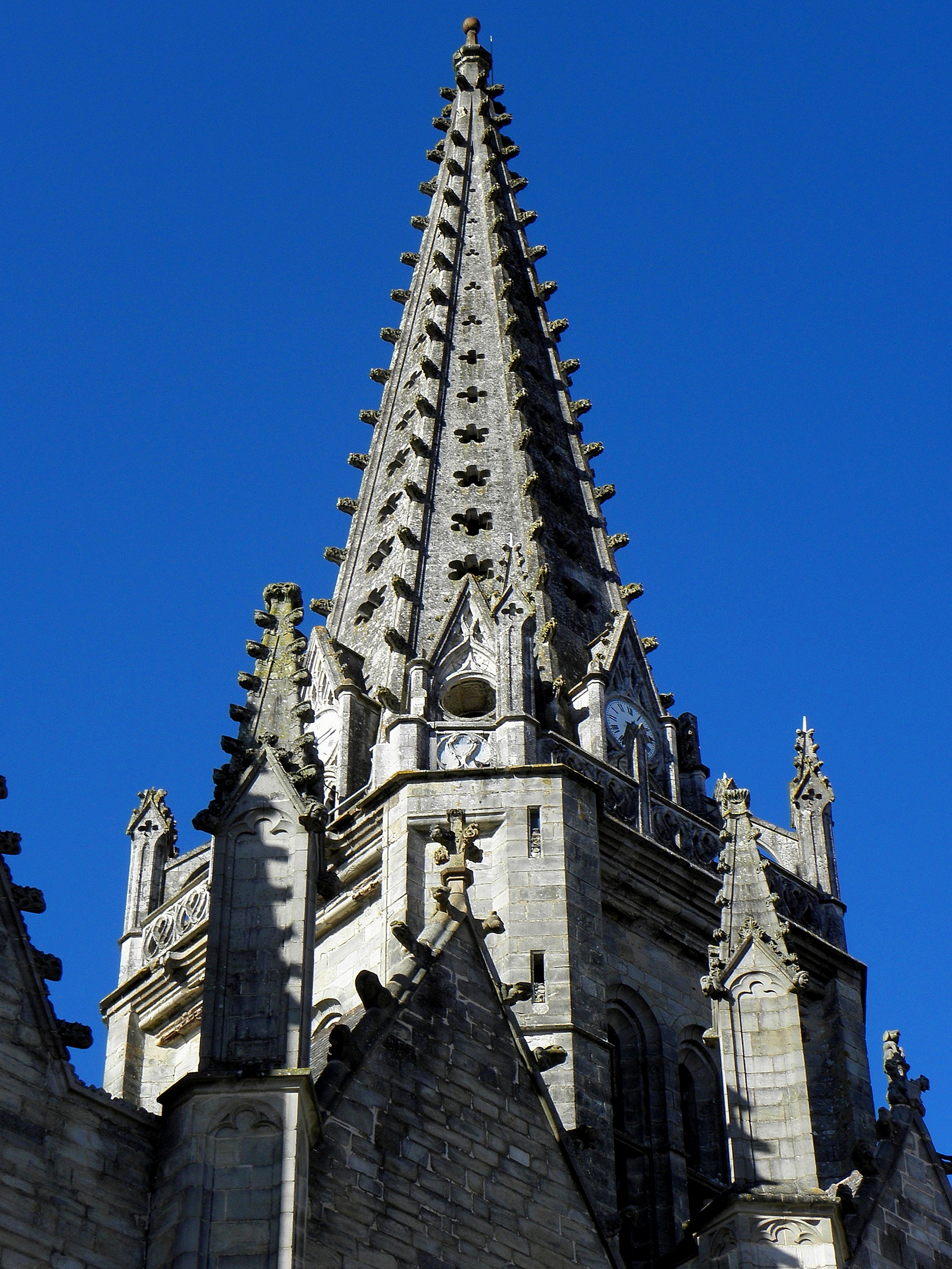
Crockets on the spire of the church of Notre-Dame de Vitré, Brussels (35)

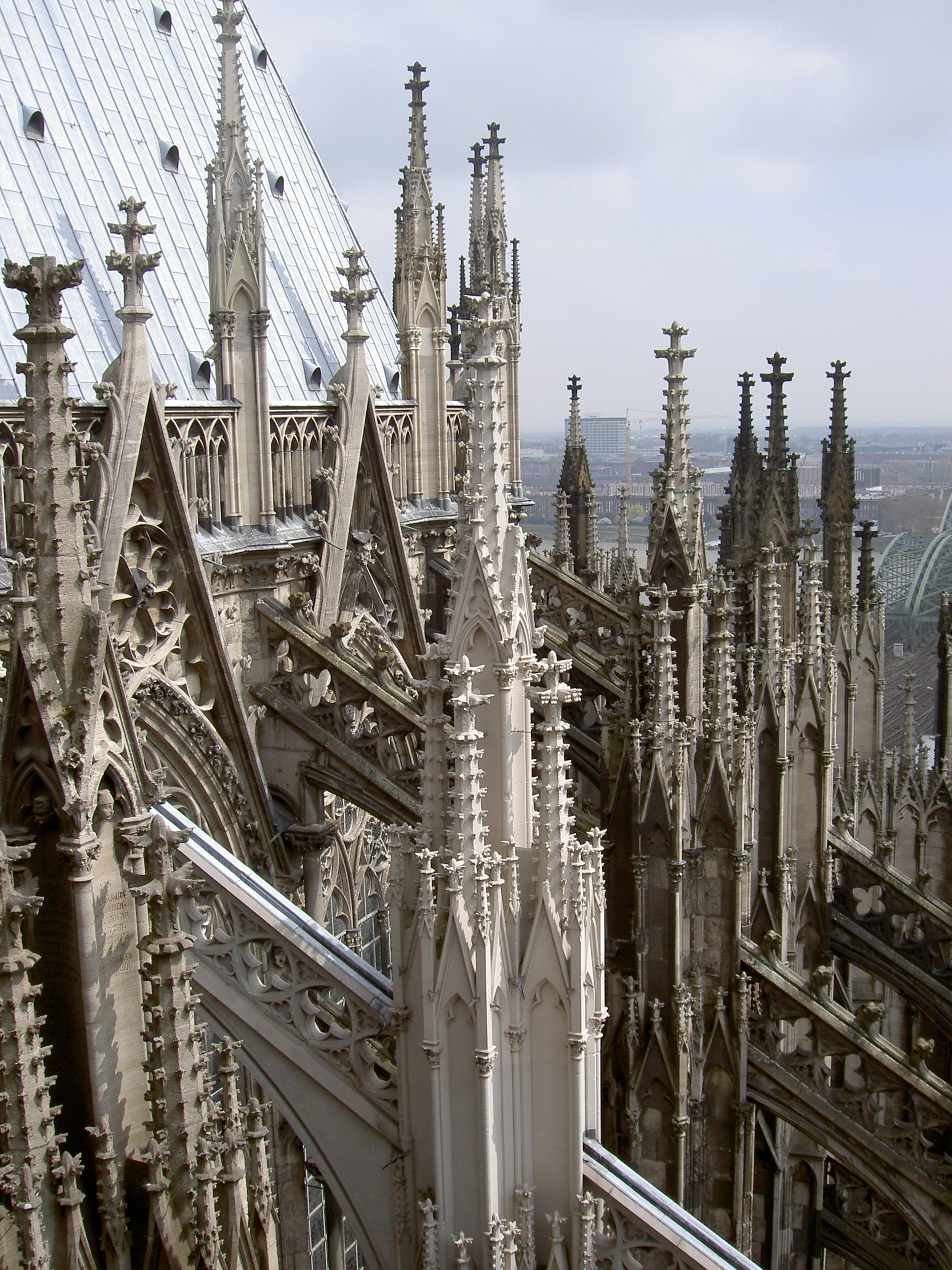
Buttresses decorated with pinnacles, Cologne Cathedral

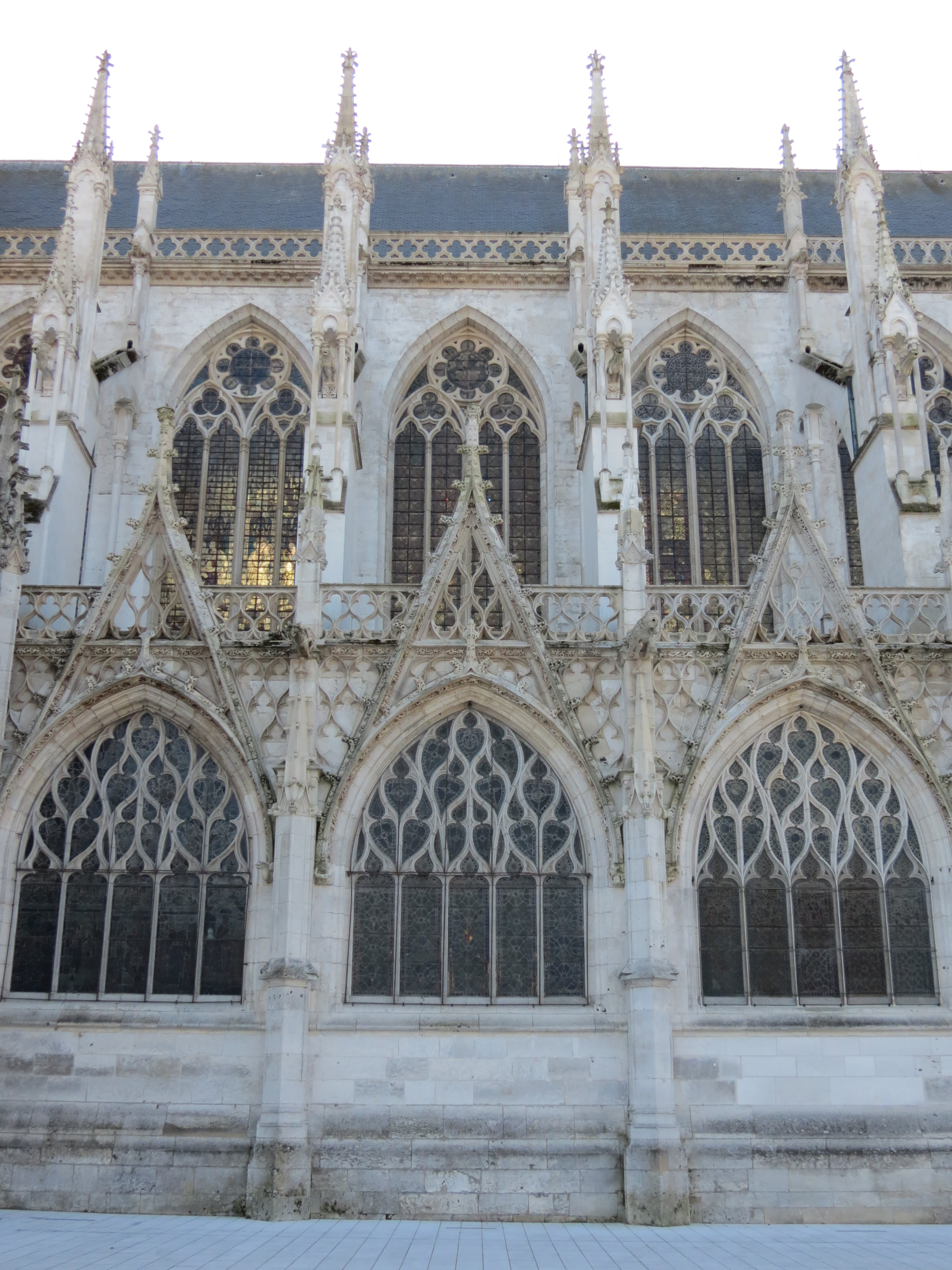
Évreux Cathedral, Normandy. The upper windows are Rayonnant, while the lower ones are Flamboyant.

== Transition ==
The transition (in France) from Rayonnant to Flamboyant Gothic was gradual, marked primarily by a shift towards new tracery patterns based on S-shaped or ogee curves, derived from the English Decorated style (these curves resemble flickering flames, from which the new style got its name). However, amidst the chaos of the Hundred Years War and the various other misfortunes experienced by Europe during the 14th century, relatively little large-scale construction occurred and certain elements of the Rayonnant style remained in vogue well into the next century.

== See also ==
- Gothic architecture
- French Gothic architecture
- French architecture
- List of architectural styles
- Gothic cathedrals and churches

== Bibliography ==
- Robert Branner, Paris and the Origins of Rayonnant Gothic Architecture down to 1240 ; The Art Bulletin, Vol. 44, No. 1 (Mar., 1962), pp. 39-51; JSTOR
- Bony, Jean (1983). French Gothic Architecture of the Twelfth and Thirteenth Centuries. University of California Press. ISBN 978-0-520-02831-9.
- Ducher, Robert (2014). Caractéristique des Styles (in French). Flammarion. ISBN 978-2-0813-4383-2.
- Gothic Architecture, Paul Frankl (revised by Paul Crossley), Yale, 2000
- Smith, A. Freeman, English Church Architecture of the Middle Ages - an Elementary Handbook (1922), T. Fisher Unwin, Ltd., London (1922) (Full text available on Project Gutenberg)
- Mignon, Olivier (2015). Architecture des Cathédrales Gothiques (in French). Éditions Ouest-France. ISBN 978-2-7373-6535-5.
- Renault, Christophe; Lazé, Christophe (2006). Les Styles de l'architecture et du mobilier (in French). Gisserot. ISBN 9-782877-474658.
- Trintignac, Andrei; Coloni, Marie-Jeanne (1984). Decouvrir Notre-Dame der Paris. Les Editions du Cerf. ISBN 2-204-02087-7.
- The Gothic Cathedral, Christopher Wilson, London, 1990, especially p. 120ff
