= Elias of Dereham =

English stonemason

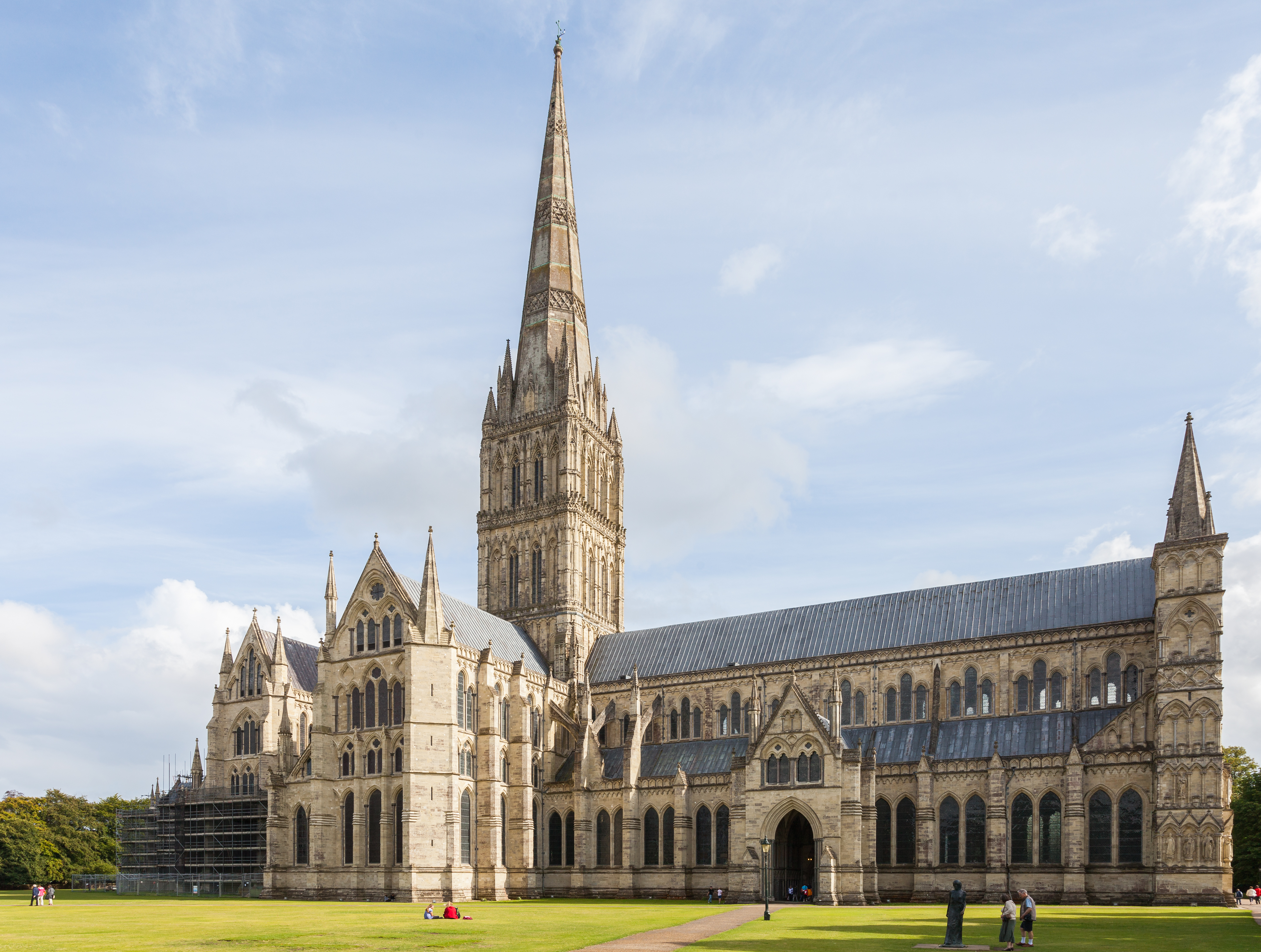
Salisbury Cathedral from the north. The tower and spire are a later addition.

Elias of Dereham (c. 1165–1245) was an English canon, clerk, and possibly architect. He has been credited with the design and organisation of several major Early English Gothic buildings, including Salisbury Cathedral and the great hall of Winchester Castle. He was closely associated with religious and political reforms, being a follower of bishops Stephen Langton of Canterbury and Jocelin of Wells, as well as distributing Magna Carta and supporting the rebels in the First Barons' War (1216-17).

== Life and career ==
Elias probably came from West Dereham in Norfolk. He may be the "Master Elias" who witnessed the charter of West Dereham Abbey in 1188, and may also have served Bishop Gilbert Glanvill of Rochester in the 1190s. It is also possible, though unlikely, that he was the "Master Elias the Engineer" who built for the Crown at Oxford and elsewhere before 1201.

In the early 13th century, Elias served first Archbishop Hubert Walter of Canterbury and then Jocelin of Wells as a steward. Elias followed Jocelin into exile during the Interdict of 1208-14, an early sign of his opposition to King John. After John was forced to accept restrictions on his rule with Magna Carta in 1215, Elias helped to distribute the document across the country. As part of this role, Elias may have given the admiring chronicler Matthew Paris access to a copy of the charter. After John made clear that he would not abide by the terms of Magna Carta, and the disaffected barons invited the French prince Louis to invade, Elias preached in favour of the rebels' cause and was again exiled. He was excluded from the general amnesty at the 1217 Peace of Lambeth, after the rebels had been defeated. Elias lost his ecclesiastical offices and properties and was forced to seek papal absolution. He was pardoned in 1220 and returned to the service of Archbishop Stephen Langton.

Elias became a canon of Salisbury Cathedral at about the time of its relocation down from the castle of Old Sarum in 1220, holding the fabric fund from 1225. Elias also built his own grand house in the cathedral close, the Leadenhall (demolished in the 20th century), in an up-to-date Early English style, with plate-traceried windows. This house was intended to form a pattern for the other canons, who were required to build their own houses in the close. Elias was associated with other building projects across southern England: he was a canon at Wells Cathedral, where reconstruction work was well underway; he was linked to the furnishing of the late 12th century choir at Canterbury Cathedral when Thomas Becket's relics were enshrined there in 1220; he assisted Ela, Countess of Salisbury in the foundation of Hinton Charterhouse; and he specified improvements to the royal castle at Winchester. He was also responsible for building work at Clarendon Palace.

He died in 1245, as recorded by Matthew Paris.

== Architectural role and legacy ==
In the 19th century, it was believed that many medieval cathedrals were designed by churchmen, and Elias was considered an example of this, along with Alan of Walsingham, the 14th century sacrist at Ely Cathedral. In the 20th century, as the biographies of master masons were elucidated by historians such as John Harvey, the design role of churchmen like Elias was reduced. Nonetheless, Elias seems to have been more than just an administrator, being praised by Matthew Paris as artifex incomporalibis (incomporable craftsman) for his work on the Becket shrine, while at Winchester Henry III directed that the chamber windows should be built following his specification. Scholarly opinion is thus divided on whether Elias may be considered the "architect" of Salisbury Cathedral, with historian Paul Binski considering it a 'vexed question'.

The chapter house at Salisbury Cathedral displays a copy of Magna Carta. This copy was brought to Salisbury because Elias, who was present at Runnymede in 1215, was to distribute original copies of the document.

== Gallery ==
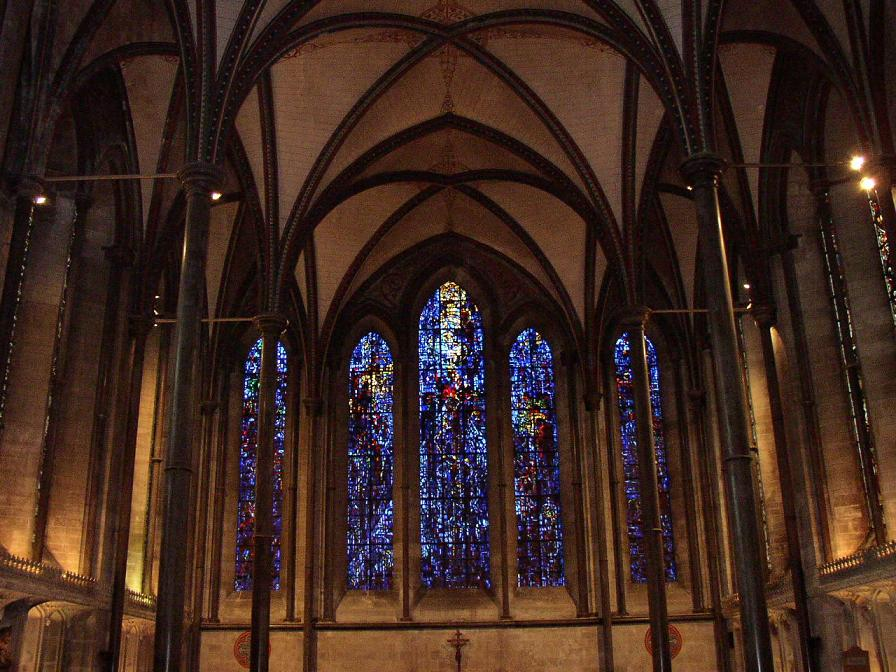
Trinity Chapel, Salisbury Cathedral

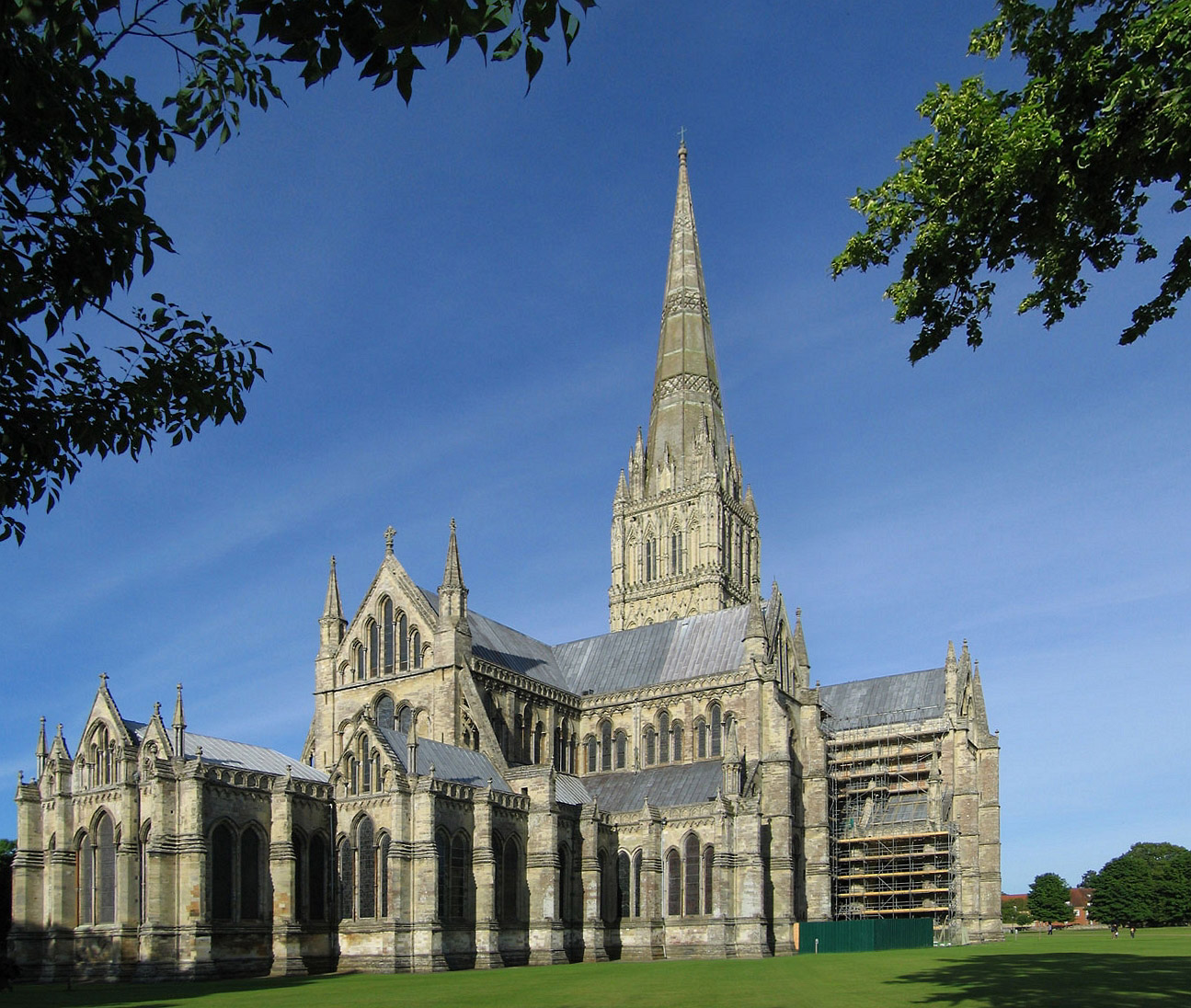
Salisbury Cathedral from the north-east

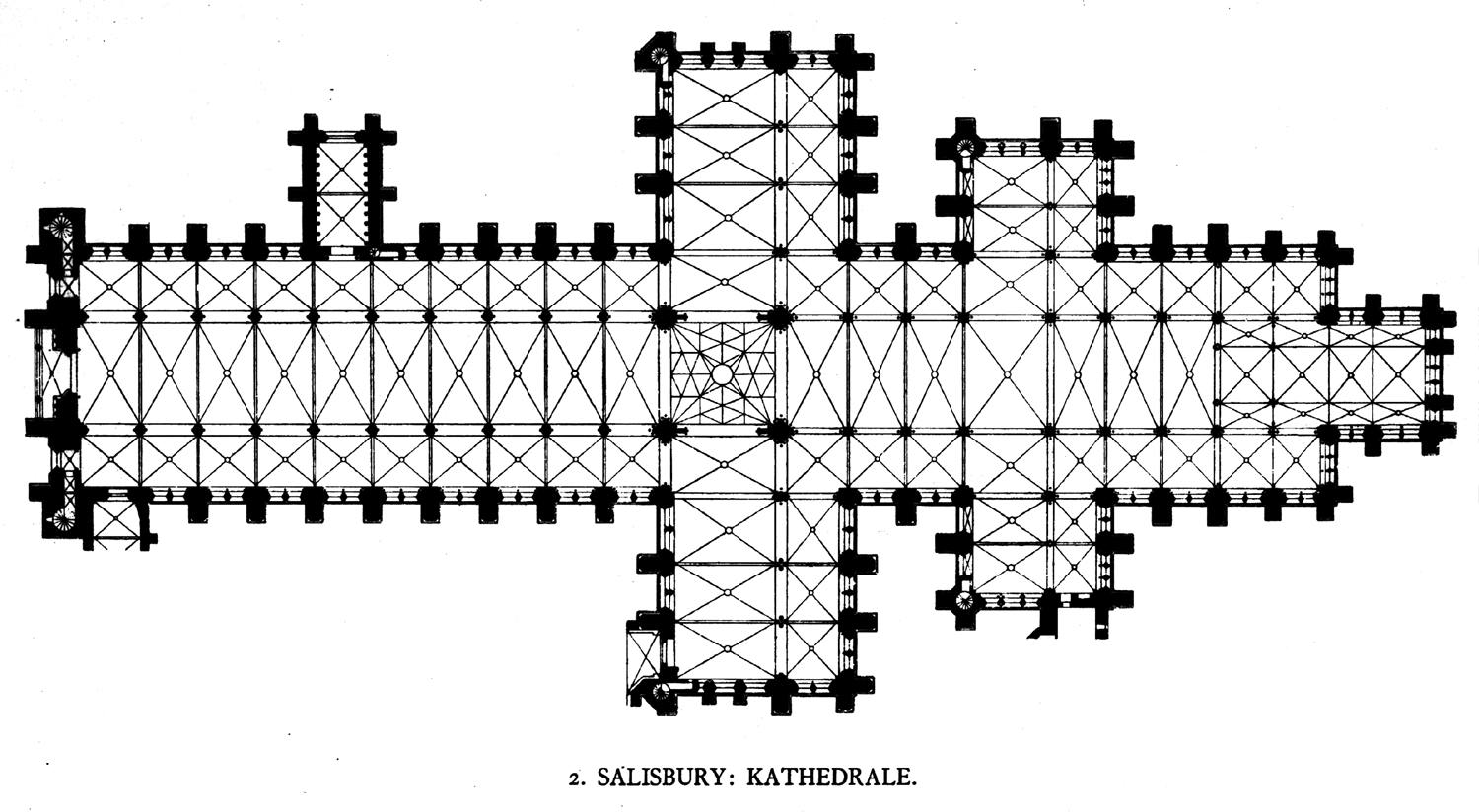
Salisbury Cathedral plan

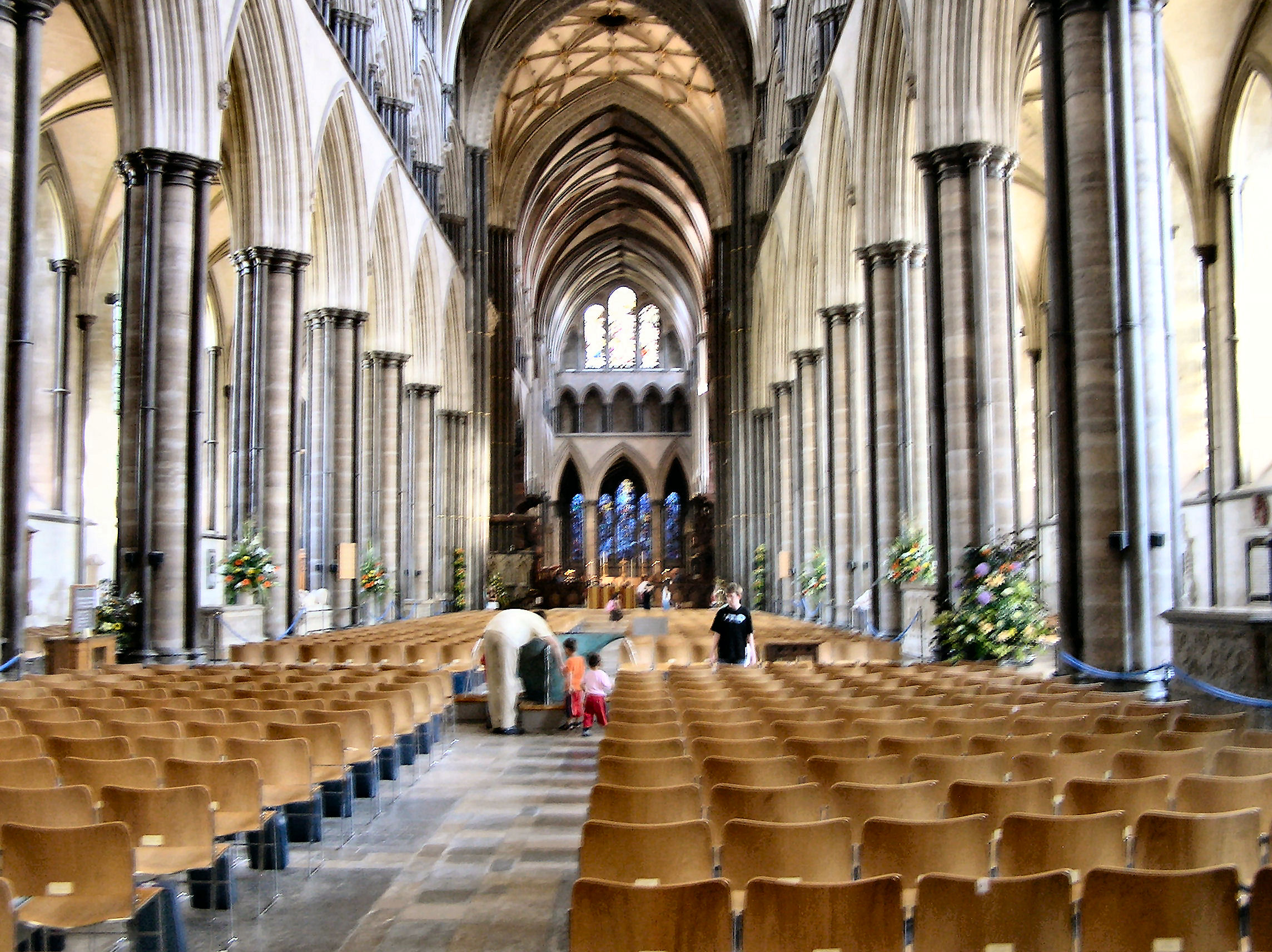
Salisbury Cathedral interior looking east

Pilgrim badge depicting the shrine of Thomas Becket.

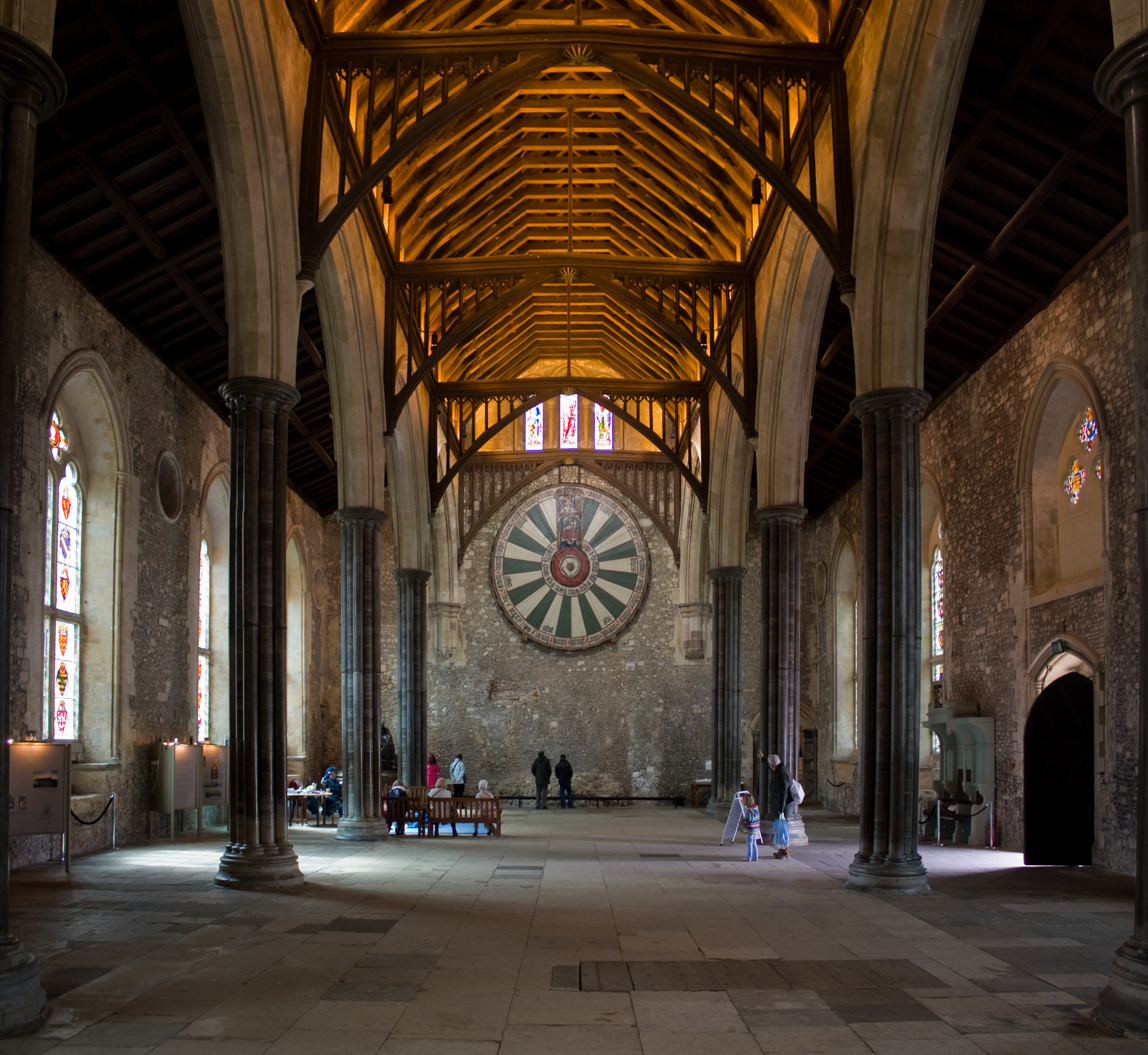
The Great Hall at Winchester Castle

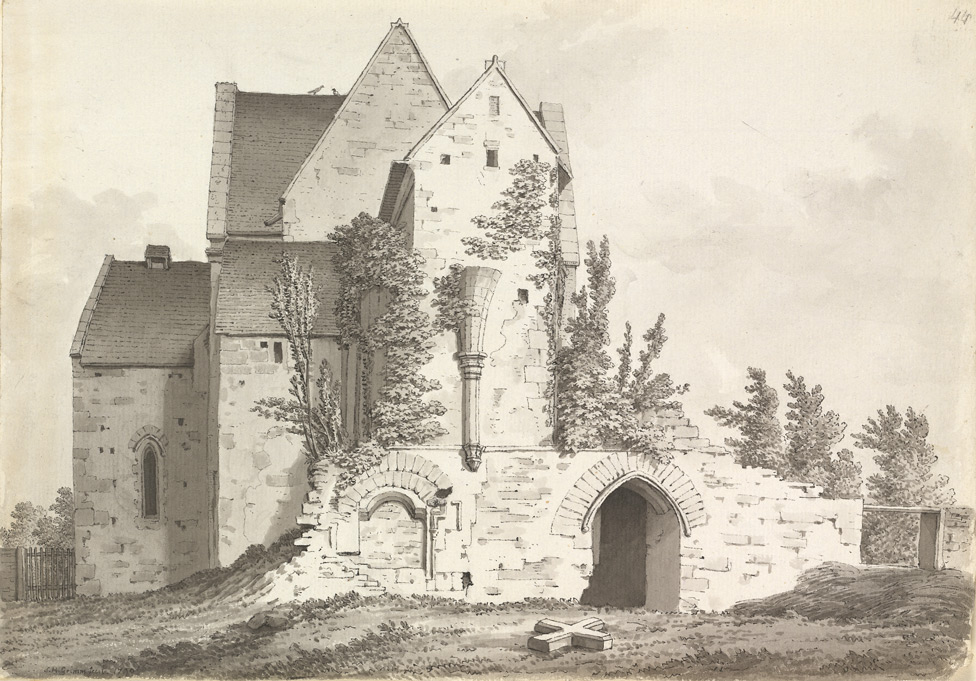
Hinton Charterhouse

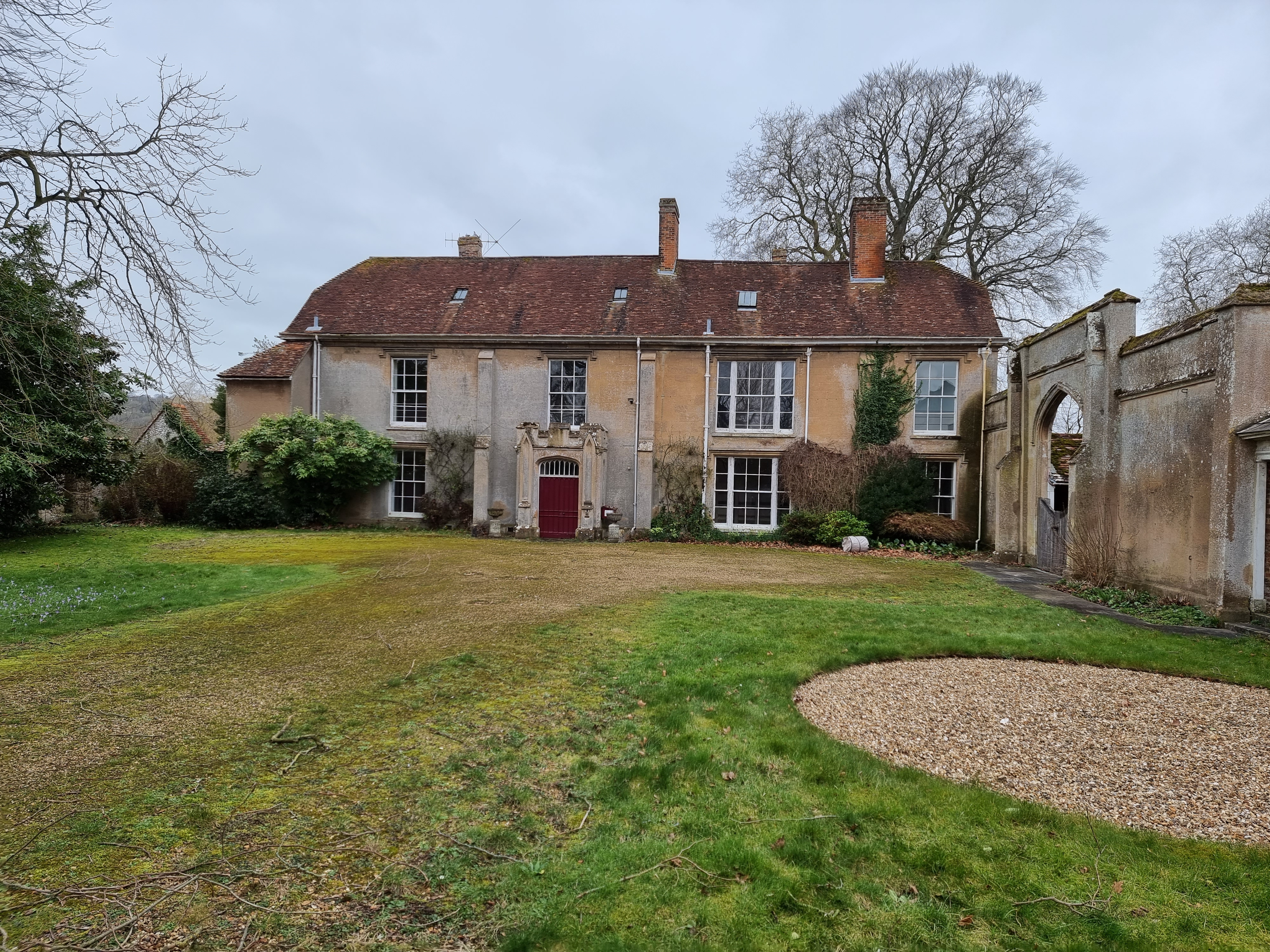
The present Leaden Hall, Salisbury

== See also ==
- Architecture of the medieval cathedrals of England
- Construction of Gothic cathedrals
- Master builder
