= Clarendon Palace =

Medieval castle ruins in England

Coordinates: 51°04′15″N 1°44′30″W

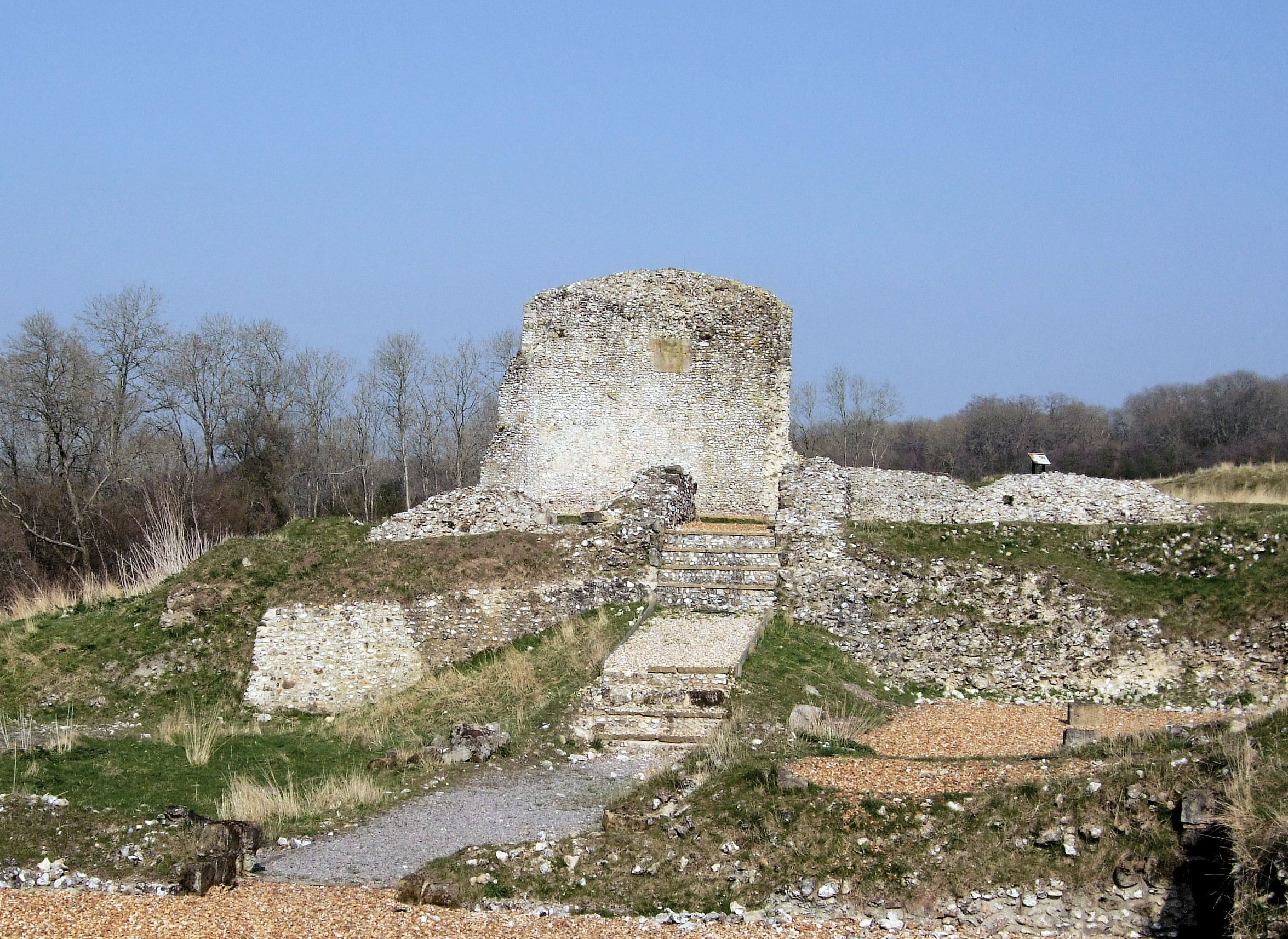
Ruins of Clarendon Palace

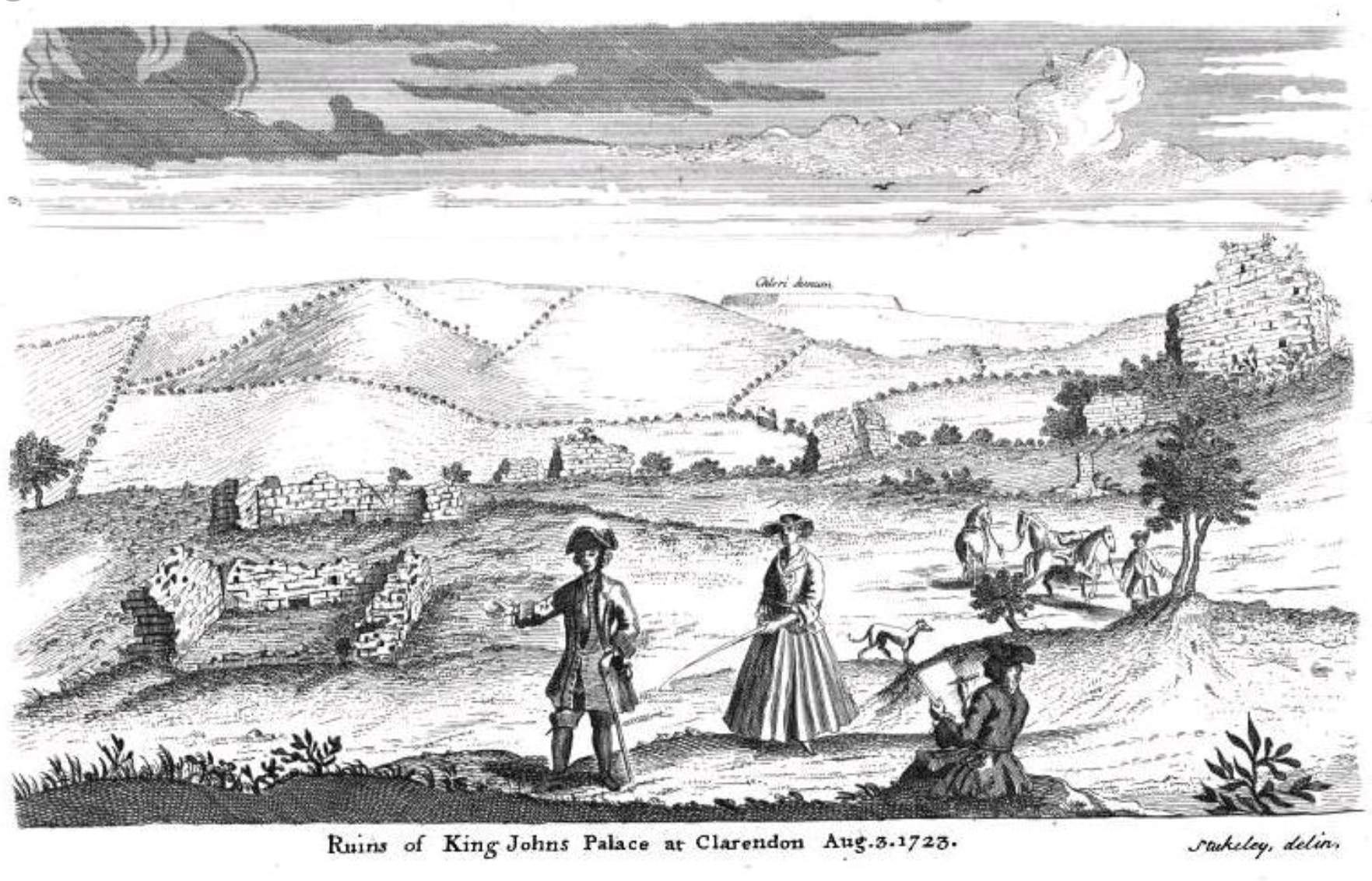
Ruins of King Johns Palace at Clarendon, engraving after William Stukeley, 1723

Clarendon Palace is a medieval ruin 2 1/4 miles (3.6 km) east of Salisbury in Wiltshire, England. The palace was a royal residence during the Middle Ages, and was the location of the Assize of Clarendon which developed the Constitutions of Clarendon. It now lies within the grounds of Clarendon Park.

== Roman era ==
There is evidence that the Romans used Clarendon Forest on a regular basis. A Roman road connecting to Old Sarum Iron Age hillfort passes east–west approximately 2 miles (3.2 km) north of Clarendon Forest. Archaeological finds suggest that the area was relatively densely populated in the Roman period.

== Hunting lodge ==
Clarendon Forest was probably in use as a royal hunting ground in the late Saxon period. It is also documented that the area was sometimes used as a military gathering-place from 1070 onwards. The name Clarendon is first recorded in 1164, and may derive from an Old English form *Claringa dūn, meaning "hill associated with Clare". A person named Clare is recorded as a witness in a charter dating from the reign of King Eadred.

The Norman kings also visited it, and the park was probably formally defined with deer leaps in the early 12th century by Henry I. Within its boundaries, the park was laid out with lawns, coppices, meadows and wood-pasture. By 1130 a hunting lodge existed within the park.

== Residence and palace ==
Both Henry II and Henry III invested heavily in the property and converted it into a royal residence and palace. Considerable building work took place in the early-to-mid 13th century, including the construction of King's Chapel and the Antioch chamber under the supervision of Elias of Dereham, the ecclesiastical administrator who also oversaw the building of Salisbury Cathedral.

In 1164, Henry II framed the Constitutions of Clarendon here, which attempted to restrict ecclesiastical privileges and place limits on Papal authority in England. A memorial erected on the site in 1844 stated:

The spirit awakened within these walls ceased not until it had vindicated the authority of the laws and accomplished the Reformation of the Church of England.

At its height, the palace consisted of several buildings surrounding a central courtyard and contained inside a small wall. The palace was rectangular with dimensions of roughly 240m by 80m totalling over 5 acres (20,000 m^{2}) and included terraced gardens.

Margaret Howell writes:

The site of the royal palace at Clarendon ... has been the subject of a recent detailed archaeological investigation, which helps to create a lively impression of [Queen Eleanor of Provence's] accommodation there in the early 1250s, shortly after a major programme of enlargement and refurbishment. Many of the details come from the chancery rolls. By 1252 Eleanor had a compact suite of apartments at Clarendon, comprising a hall, a chapel, three chambers and a wardrobe. They were situated on two floors. The rooms were spacious, two of them extending to a length of 40 feet, and the amenities of her chambers had been greatly improved by the adjacent construction of a two-storey building providing access to "a fair privy chamber, well vaulted on both floors". The focal point of the queen's hall was an imposing new fireplace with double marble columns on each side and an overmantel carved with representations of the twelve months of the year. The windows of her rooms were glazed, perhaps mainly in plain glass or the delicate silver-grey grisaille patterns, but also with some figured glass, which would be coloured. The windows of her hall overlooked a garden. The chapel, on the upper floor, had a marble altar, flanked by two windows, which could be opened and closed, and above the altar was a crucifix, with the figures of Mary and John. Religious imagery was not confined to the chapel; in the window of one of the queen's chambers there was a representation of the Virgin and Child with the kneeling figure of an earthly queen, presumably Queen Eleanor herself, with an Ave Maria scroll. ... The walls of the chapel were initially painted with scenes from the life of St. Katharine, but later redecorated "with symbols and stories as arranged". One distinctively up-to-date feature of these rooms were [sic] the tiled floors, and the remaining portion of one of these, lifted in the post-war excavations at Clarendon, can be seen on the far wall in the medieval ceramics room of the British Museum. The pavement dates from 1250–2 and was laid in one of Eleanor's ground-floor chambers. Divided into panels of patterned and figured tiles, glowing in muted shades of gold, grey, and warm pink, its power to evoke is incomparable.

It was in 1453 at Clarendon Palace that Henry VI first started to show signs of insanity. Usage of the Palace declined and by 1500 the building was no longer being maintained, and in 1574 it was described as a simple hunting lodge. In that year, Elizabeth I visited the site, but the buildings were in such poor condition that she had to dine in a temporary "banquett house".

== Confiscation and decay ==
In 1649 the execution of Charles I resulted in the confiscation of Clarendon Palace by Parliament. Following the restoration of Charles II in 1660, the park passed briefly into the hands of George Monck, and then in 1664 to Edward Hyde, who (apparently in anticipation of acquiring the estate) had already, in 1661, taken the title Earl of Clarendon.

A new mansion, Clarendon Park, was built in a classical design elsewhere in the park in the early 18th century. Abandoned, Clarendon Palace deteriorated, and by the 18th century the ruins survived only as a romantic "eye-catcher" in the landscape, and as simple farm buildings. Nikolaus Pevsner wrote in 1963:

... today Clarendon is a tragedy. A footpath leads into the wood. One threads one's way through elder and wild clematis. A solitary old iron notice-board of the Ministry of Works indicates that one has arrived. One crag of walling stands up. All the rest is back to its sleeping beauty.

A series of campaigns of archaeological excavation were undertaken at the site between 1933 and 1939 by the Finnish art historian Tancred Borenius. Further excavations were carried out in 1957, 1964, 1965 and in the 1970s and 1980s. A tile-kiln discovered on the site has been reconstructed and is now at the British Museum.

All that is visible now above ground level is the one end wall of the Great Hall. The site is a scheduled monument.

== Bibliography ==
- Borenius, J.; Charlton, J. (1936). "Clarendon Palace: an interim report". Antiquaries Journal. 16: 55–84. doi:10.1017/s0003581500011380. S2CID 159755387.
- Colvin, H. M.; Brown, R. Allen; Taylor, A. J. (1963). The History of the King's Works. Vol. 2. London: HMSO. pp. 910–918. ISBN 978-0-11-670449-8.
- Eames, E. S. (1963). "A 13th-century tiled pavement from the King's Chapel, Clarendon Palace". Journal of the British Archaeological Association. 3rd ser. 26: 40–50. doi:10.1080/00681288.1963.11894826.
- Eames, Elizabeth (1965). "The Royal Apartments at Clarendon Palace in the Reign of Henry III". Journal of the British Archaeological Association. 3rd ser. 28: 57–85. doi:10.1080/00681288.1965.11894849.
- Eames, E. S. (1972). "Further notes on a 13th-century tiled pavement from the King's Chapel, Clarendon Palace". Journal of the British Archaeological Association. 3rd ser. 35: 71–5. doi:10.1080/00681288.1972.11894924.
- Ekblom, Einar (1917). The Place-Names of Wiltshire. Uppsala: Appelberg.
- Friends of Clarendon Palace (2023) [2010]. Clarendon, Landscape, Palace and Mansion. Hobnob Press. ISBN 978-1-914407-47-5.
- Howell, Margaret (1998). Eleanor of Provence: queenship in thirteenth-century England. Oxford: Blackwell. ISBN 0-631-22739-3.
- James, Tom Beaumont; Robinson, A. M. (1988). Clarendon Palace: the History and Archaeology of a Medieval Palace and Hunting Lodge near Salisbury, Wiltshire. Society of Antiquaries and Thames & Hudson.
- James, Tom Beaumont; Gerrard, Christopher (2007). Clarendon: Landscape of Kings. Bollington: Windgather Press. ISBN 9781905119103.
- Pevsner, Nikolaus; Cherry, Bridget (1975). Wiltshire. Buildings of England (2nd ed.). Harmondsworth: Penguin. pp. 180–81.
- Richardson, Amanda (2005). The Medieval forest, park and palace of Clarendon, Wiltshire c.1200 – c.1650: Reconstructing an actual, conceptual and documented Wiltshire landscape. British Archaeological Reports British Series. Vol. 387. Oxford: Archaeopress. ISBN 1-84171-825-4.
