= Hugues Libergier =

French architect

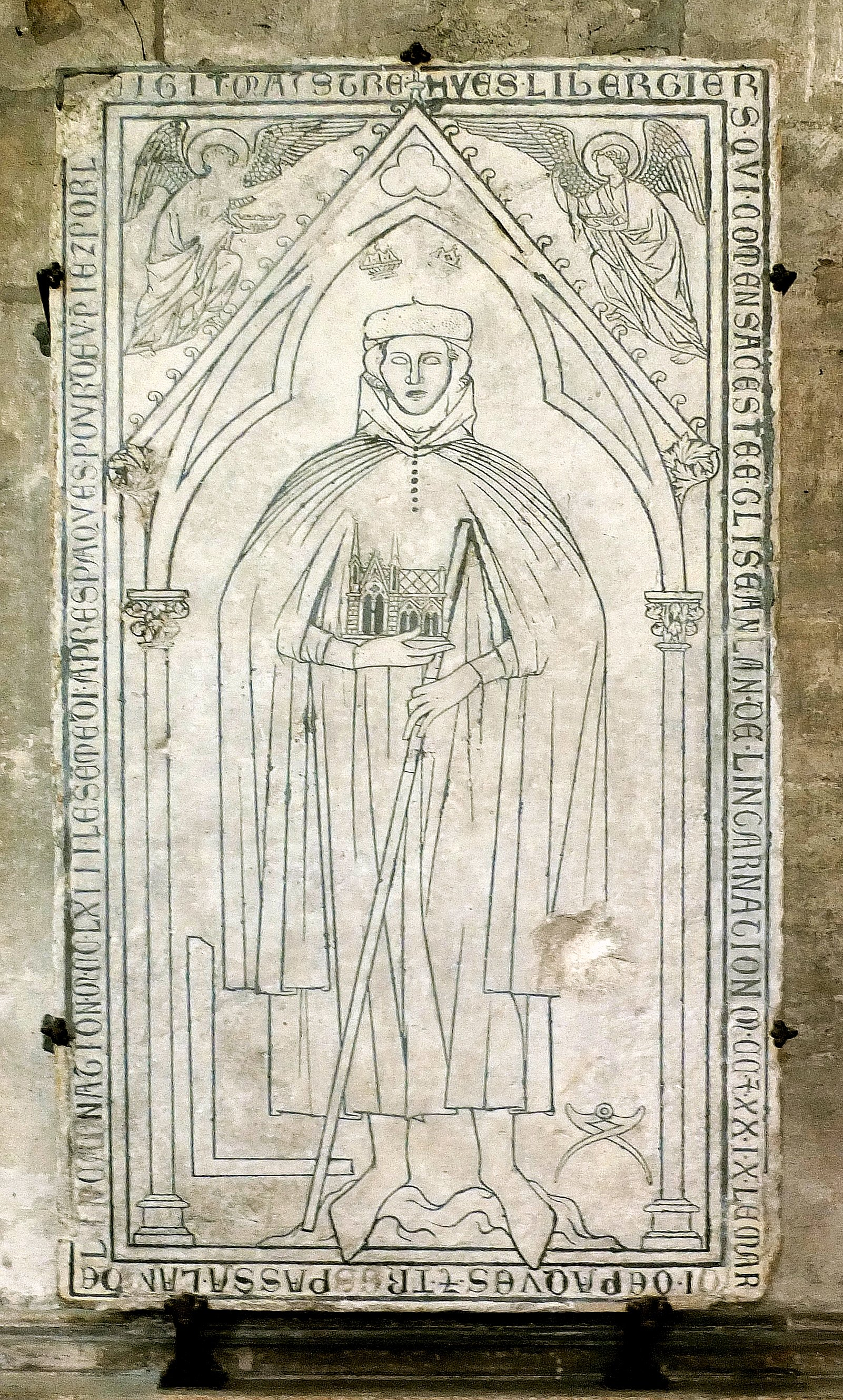
Hugues Libergier's tombstone

Hugues Libergier (Unknown–1263) was a medieval French architect and master mason of the Gothic era who worked in Reims, France. He contributed to the Rayonnant Gothic style, and notably directed the building of the Old Church of Saint-Nicaise de Reims begun in 1231. Libergier is commemorated on a tomb slab that now resides in Reims Cathedral.

== Abbey of Saint-Nicaise ==
The Abbey of Saint-Nicaise was designed by Libergier, and its construction started in 1231. The church's nave, portals, and facade were finished before Libergier's death in 1263. After his death, work was resumed in 1264 by Robert de Coucy to be completed in 1311. Libergier was buried at Saint-Nicaise, but the church was destroyed in 1798 during the French Revolution. Other than the Abbey of Saint-Nicaise in Reims, Libergier is not known to have designed any other buildings.

=== Innovations and influence ===
Libergier produced a unique architecture that modified the existing Gothic style of the time, and contributed to the development of the Rayonnant Gothic style in France. One of Libergier's innovations at Saint-Nicaise was a gabled screen that was stretched across the portal zone of the facade. Elements of Libergier's design influenced other Gothic churches including Reims Cathedral and Notre-Dame Cathedral.

== Tomb slab ==
After Saint-Nicaise was destroyed, Libergier's tomb was transferred to Reims Cathedral in 1800. The slab of his catafalque was the only survivor of destruction. On the slab, he is represented in his city costume, and he is depicted with the tools of his profession. In his right arm, he holds a model of the Abbey of Saint-Nicaise, and in his left hand, he holds a measuring rod. A try square and a sector are portrayed at his feet.

The slab reads: ci-gît maistre Hugues Libergiers qui commença ceste église en l'an de l'incarnation MCC et XXIX [1229] le mardi de Pâques et trépassa en l'an de l'incarnation MCCLXIII [1263] le samedi après Pâques. Pour Dieu, priez pour lui.
