= Pierre de Montreuil =

French architect

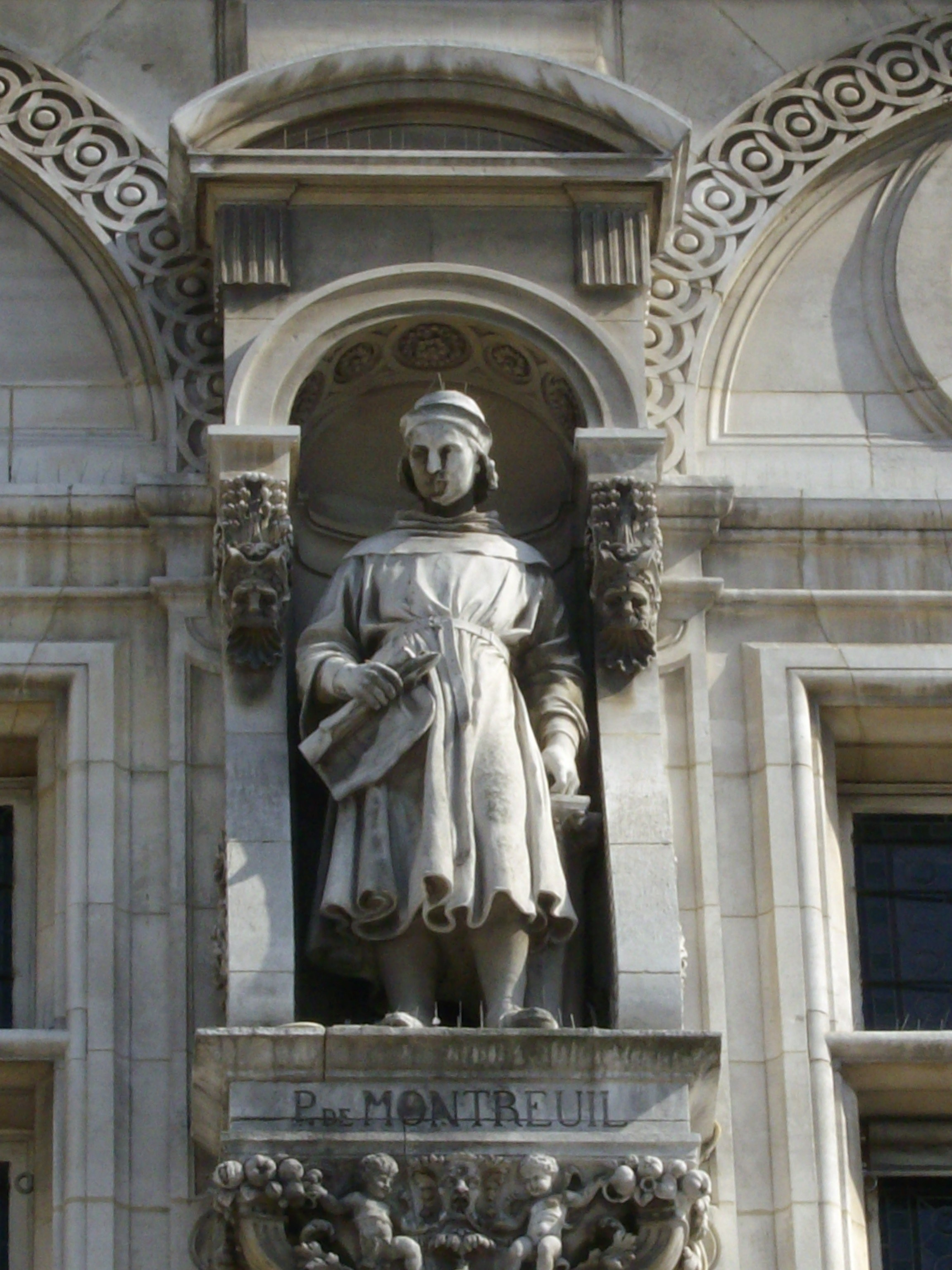
Statue of Pierre de Montreuil on the facade the Hôtel de Ville, Paris

Pierre de Montreuil (French pronunciation: [pjɛʁ də mɔ̃tʁœj]; died 17 March 1267) was a French architect. The name formerly given to him by architectural historians, Peter of Montereau (in French, Pierre de Montereau), is a misnomer. It was based on his tombstone inscription Musterolo natus ("born in Musterolo"), a place name that was mistakenly identified as Montereau rather than Montreuil.

== Documented work ==
He is one of the first named architects of 13th-century Paris, and, according to Anne Prache (writing in The Dictionary of Art), "there has been a tendency to attribute an immense role to him." Only the refectory (1239–1244, destroyed) and chapel of the Virgin (1245–c. 1250, only fragments remain) of the former abbey of Saint-Germain-des-Prés can be definitely said to be by him. He is thought to have been a master at the Basilique Saint-Denis beginning around 1247, although his specific contributions are unknown, and it is also generally agreed that he completed the south transept of Notre-Dame de Paris in the 1260s, after the death of Jean de Chelles.

== Other attributions ==
Among other attributions, the design of the Sainte-Chapelle in Paris was for a long time credited to him, but probably incorrectly, and alternative authors have been proposed, including Robert de Luzarches and Thomas de Cormont. The similar Sainte-Chapelle de Vincennes has also been attributed to him. It is not known when it was begun, but its walls had only reached the bases of the windows at the time of Charles V's death in 1380, and its decoration is almost entirely of the 14th century. The refectory of the Priory of Saint-Martin-des-Champs in Paris (today the library of the Conservatoire National des Arts et Métiers) has also been attributed to Pierre de Montreuil, but without documentation; the window design probably dates to 1230–1240, that is, before Montreuil is believed to have been active. Many authors have also attributed the Chapelle Saint-Louis (built 1230–1238) at the Château de Saint-Germain-en-Laye to Montreuil.

== Status as an architect ==
In 1260 Louis IX hired Montreuil to survey a house that was the subject of a dispute.

He was buried in Saint-Germain-des-Prés, in the chapel he had built. His epitaph was engraved on the tomb and gave his title as "doctor lathomorum" ("teacher of masons" or "Doctor of Masons"). (This chapel and the refectory of Saint-Germain-des-Prés were demolished in 1794.) The epitaph reads as follows: "Here lies Pierre de Montreuil, perfect flower of good morality, in his lifetime doctor of stonework, may the King of Heaven lead him to celestial heights."

Pierre owned a quarry that supplied building materials, and he was well regarded and consulted on building projects as an expert, becoming wealthy and owning several properties. That he and his wife were buried together at a prominent monastery, and he was referred to as a doctor, attests to his standing.

== Family ==
His family in Montreuil comprised a dynasty of architects. Raoul de Montreuil, who paid the cost of burying Pierre's wife Agnes in 1276, was probably the son of Eudes de Montreuil, who was either the son or brother of Pierre. Both Raoul and Eudes were directors of royal building projects in the latter part of the 13th century.

== Bibliography ==
- Ayers, Andrew (2004). The Architecture of Paris. Stuttgart; London: Edition Axel Menges. ISBN 9783930698967.
- Carruthers, Mary Jean (2010). Rhetoric Beyond Words: Delight and Persuasion in the Arts of the Middle Ages. Cambridge: Cambridge University Press. ISBN 9780521515306.
- Erlande-Brandenburg, Alain (1996). "Paris, V, 2 : Sainte-Chapelle" in Turner 1996, vol. 24, pp. 156–157.
- Félibien, André; Félibien, Jean-François (1725). Entretiens sur les vies et sur les ouvrages des plus excellens peintres anciens et modernes : avec la vie des architectes, 6 volumes. A. Trevoux. Vols 1, 2, 3, 4, 5, and 6, from the Getty Research Institute at the Internet Archive.
- Gallet, Yves (2018). "Pierre de Montreuil, architecte de la Sainte-Chapelle ? Généalogie d'une erreur" in Regards croisés sur le monument médiéval. Mélanges offerts à Claude Andrault-Schmitt, Brepols, 2018, pp. 181-197.
- Gimpel, Jean (1977). Medieval Machine: The Industrial Revolution of the Middle Ages. Middlesex, England: Penguin Books. ISBN 9780760735831.
- Prache, Anne (1996). "Pierre de Montreuil" in Turner 1996, vol. 24, pp. 774–775.
- Sturgis, Russell (1901). A Dictionary of Architecture and Building, 3 volumes. New York: Macmillan. Vols. 1 (1901), 2 (1901), and 3 (1905) at Google Books.
- Turner, Jane, editor (1996). The Dictionary of Art, 34 volumes, reprinted with minor corrections in 1998. New York: Grove. ISBN 9781884446009.
