= Cormont (surname) =

Cormont or de Cormont is a surname. Notable people with the surname include:

- Ethan Cormont (born 2000), French athlete
- Renaud de Cormont, French Gothic Era master-mason and architect
- Thomas de Cormont, French Gothic Era master-mason and architect, father of Renaud
