= Eudes de Montreuil =

Eudes de Montreuil was a 13th-century French master builder, sculptor and combat engineer. He may have died in 1289.

Under the reign of Louis IX of France, Montreuil erected many buildings in Paris, mainly churches, the chapel of the Hôtel-Dieu, the église des Chartreux, the église des Blancs-Manteaux, the église des Cordeliers de Paris, the Couvent des Mathurins de Paris, the église de Sainte-Catherine, the Hospice of the Quinze-Vingts. He is attributed the main portal of the church of Mantes-la-Ville (Yvelines).

He carved his own tomb: a bas-relief representing him holding a try square and surrounded by his two wives. This tomb disappeared in the fire of the church of the Cordeliers of Paris on 15 November 1580.

De Montreuil may have been the father of architect Pierre de Montreuil.
