= Renaud de Cormont =

French architect, master-mason

- Occupations: Architect and master-mason
- Years active: fl. 1240–1250
- Notable work: Amiens Cathedral
- Father: Thomas de Cormont

Renaud de Cormont was a French Gothic Era master-mason and architect who worked on the Cathedral of Notre-Dame in Amiens after his father, Thomas de Cormont, who is believed to have been a disciple of Robert de Luzarches.

Renaud continued his father's work on Notre-Dame of Amiens in the 1240s and is believed to have brought a form of architectural revolution to the upper transept and upper choir of the cathedral through his introduction of a glazed triforium, openwork flyers, and new decorative forms.

Renaud also altered the eastern wall of the transept and upper levels of the choir into an ornate glass box held by extremely thin flyers. However, this structure was not sound: the triforium had to be replaced, the tracery panels on the flyers crumbled and the transept roses failed. Of more concern was that the entire eastern half of the building needed to be held up using wooden beams, iron chain, masonry spines and an additional rank of flyers.

Art historians have likened Renaud to Icarus because his defective work on the upper transept and choir led to a near disaster. This is also likely a play on the fact that the center of the cathedral contains a labyrinth design on the floor and his father had worked on the cathedral before him and could be likened to Icarus' father, Daedalus.
