= Notre-Dame-des-Blancs-Manteaux =

Church in Paris, France

Notre-Dame des Blancs-Manteaux
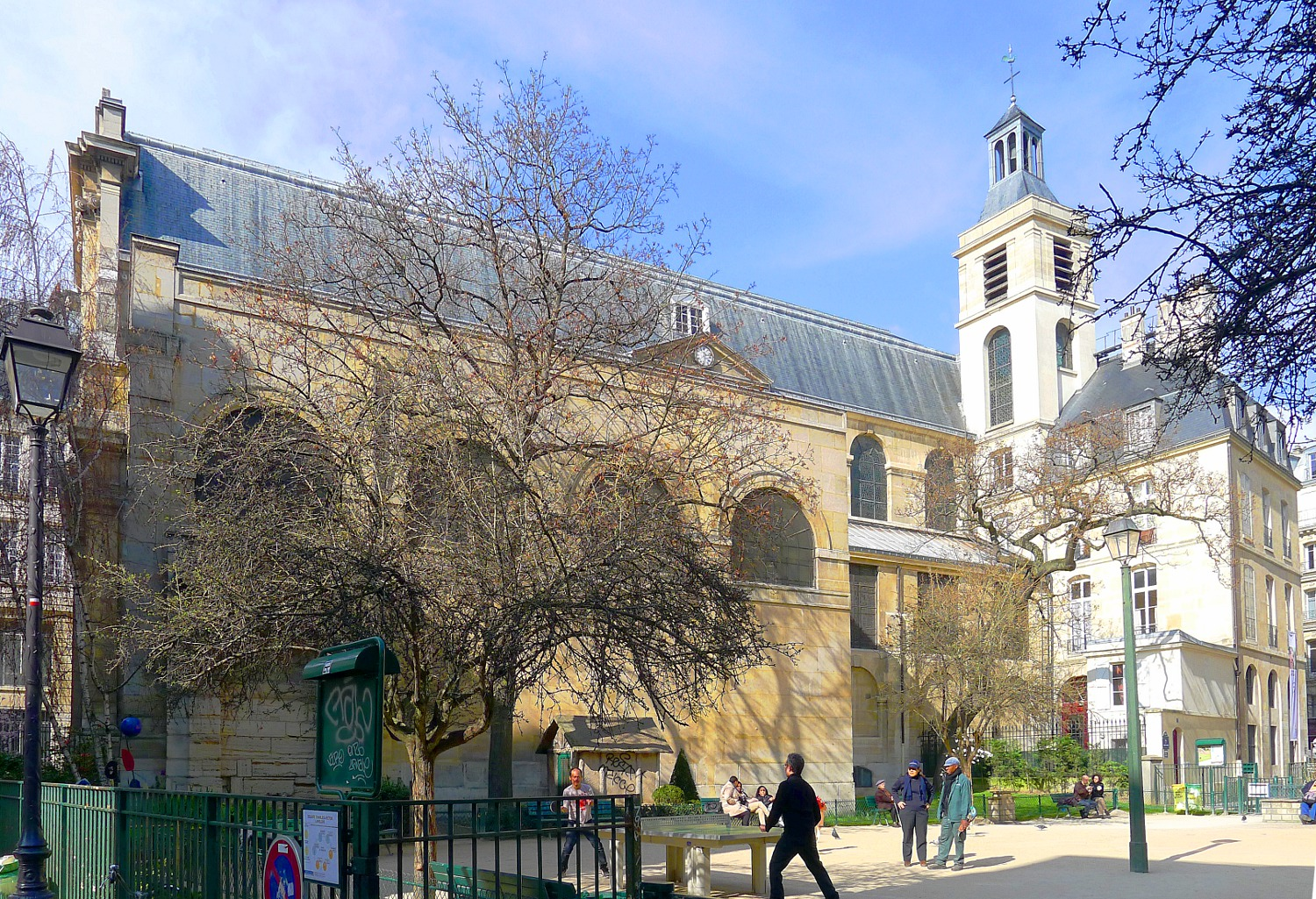

Religion
- Affiliation: Catholic Church
- Province: Archdiocese of Paris
- Region: Île-de-France
- Rite: Roman Rite
- Status: Active

Location
- Location: 2 Rue des Blancs-Manteaux, 4th arrondissement of Paris
- State: France
- Interactive map of Notre-Dame des Blancs-Manteaux
- Coordinates: 48°51′32″N 2°21′27″E

Architecture
- Type: Parish church
- Style: French Baroque
- Groundbreaking: 1685
- Completed: 1690
- Monument historique
- Official name: Monastère des Blancs-Manteaux (ancien)
- Designated: 1983
- Reference no.: PA00086472
- Denomination: Église

Website
- www.ndbm.fr

Notre-Dame des Blancs-Manteaux is a Roman Catholic parish church at 12 Rue des Blancs-Manteaux in Le Marais, in the 4th arrondissement of Paris. It takes its name from the "Les Blancs-Manteaux" ("white mantles"), for the cloaks worn by the mendicant Augustinian Order of Servites, who founded the first church 1258. It was rebuilt between 1685 and 1689 in the French Baroque or French neoclassical style. It is noted for its remarkable carved wood pulpit (1749) and its collection of paintings and sculpture.

== History ==
The church was founded by the Serfs de Marie, a community of monks founded in 1223 in Marseille, who followed the rules of Saint Augustine, and wore a black robe with a white mantle. With the support of King Louis XIII, they moved to Paris, and were given a large plot of land in the Marais district, just outside the city walls, formerly owned by the Order of the Knights Templar. It extended the length of the old rue de la Petite Parchemerie, now rue des Blancs-Manteaux. They built their first church there in 1258. Soon afterwards, However, in 1274, the Second Council of Lyon, held by the Vatican, decided to dissolve twenty-two different religious orders, including the Serfs de Marie. The abbey was transferred to the Order of the Brothers of Saint Guillaume of Malval and then, in 1618, to the Benedictine monks of the Order of Saint Maurus, who placed the novice monks there for their education. The monks no longer wore the white mantle, but the name "Blancs-Manteaux" stayed with the church.

The present church was rebuilt between 1685 and 1690 by architect Charles Duval in the style of French Baroque architecture or French classicism of the reign of Louis XIV. The royal chancellor, Michel Le Tellier, laid the first stone in 1685. In 1796-97, During the French Revolution, all the monastic orders were suppressed; the church was pillaged and sold, and the other buildings of the abbey were demolished. IN 1801, under the Concordate of Napoleon Bonaparte with the Pope, the building was returned to the church and restored.

In 1863, during Haussmann's renovation of Paris under Napoléon III. the church was enlarged. The architect Victor Baltard added an eighth traverse to the structure facing rue des Blancs-Manteaux, and attached the portal and facade of the Church of Saint-Éloi from the Île de la Cité, which had been demolished to make way for the new Boulevard du Palais.

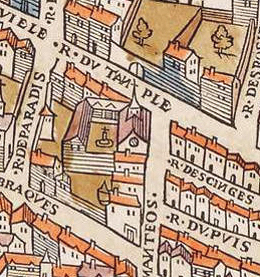
The church and abbey on the 1550 Truschet and Hoyau plan of Paris

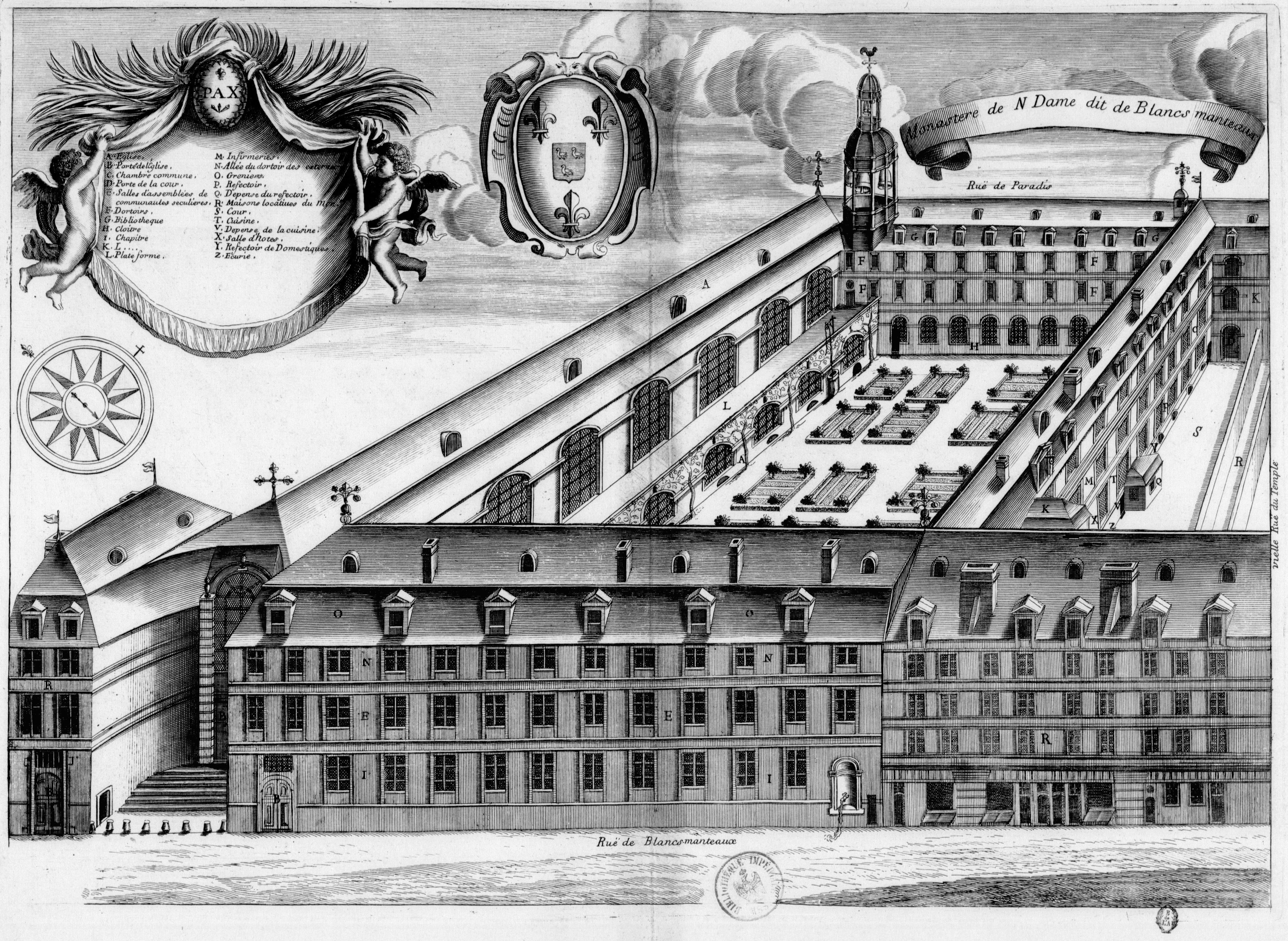
The church and abbey in the 17th century

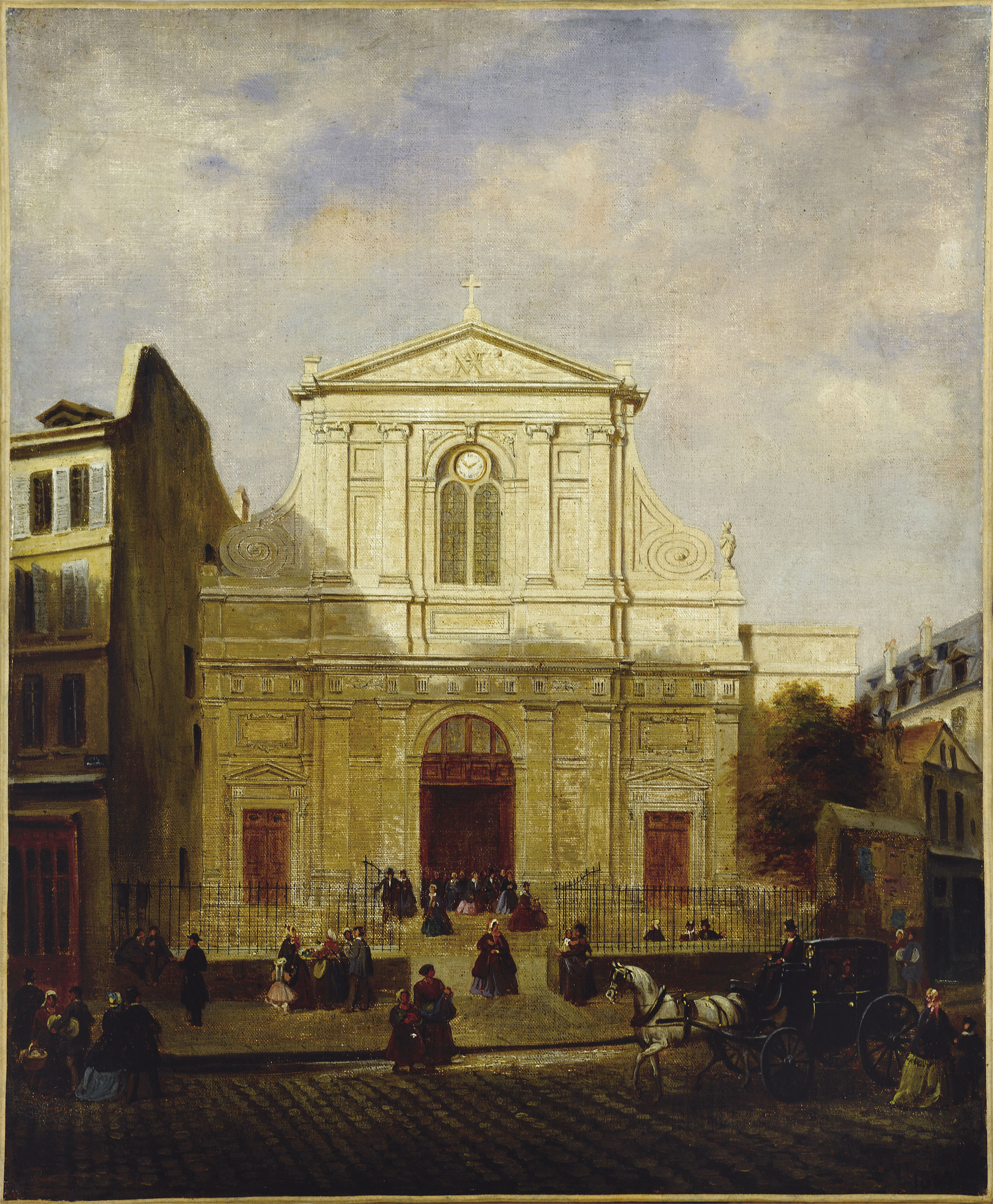
Facade in 1865

== Exterior ==
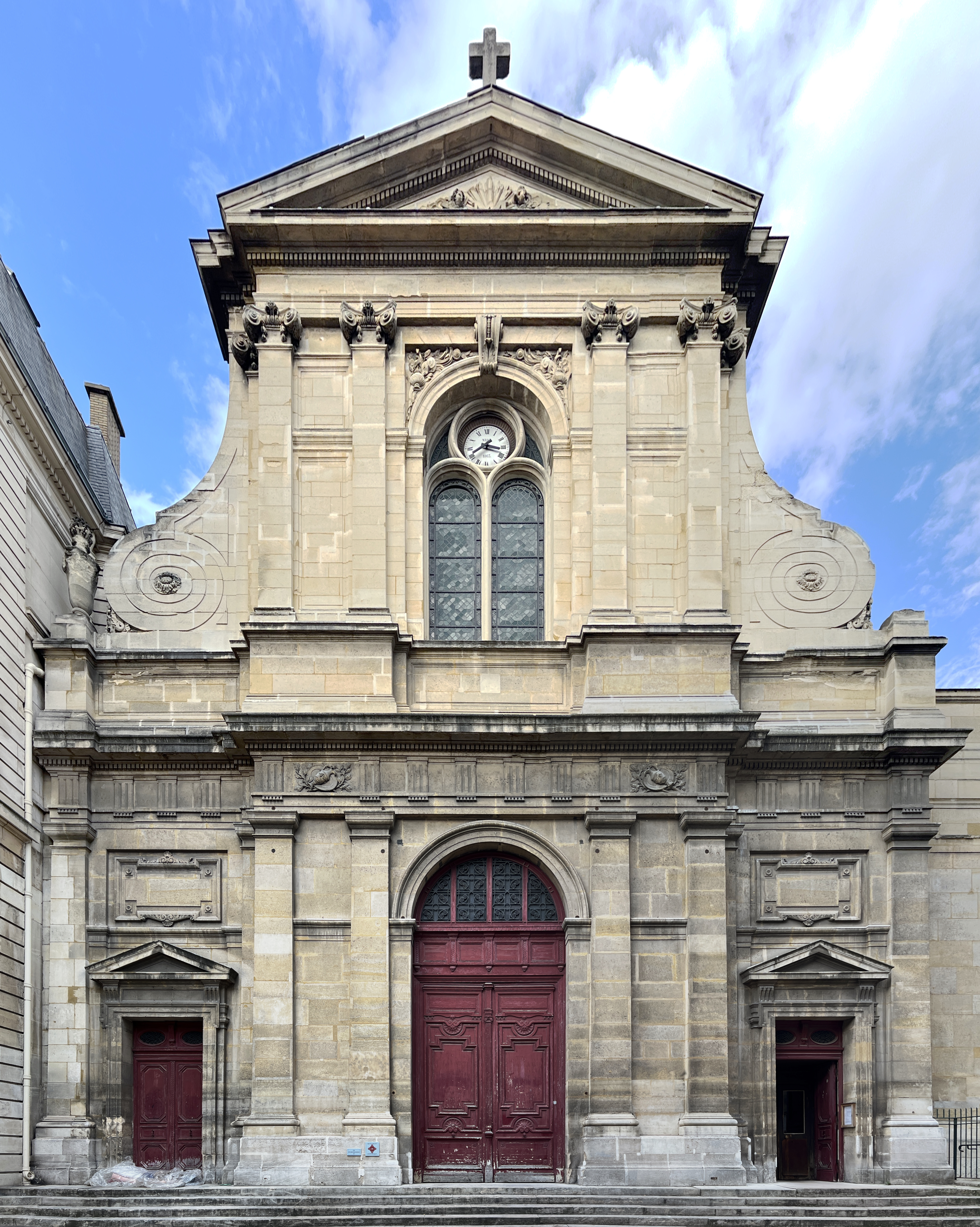
The south facade; lower portion originally belonging to another church demolished in 1863

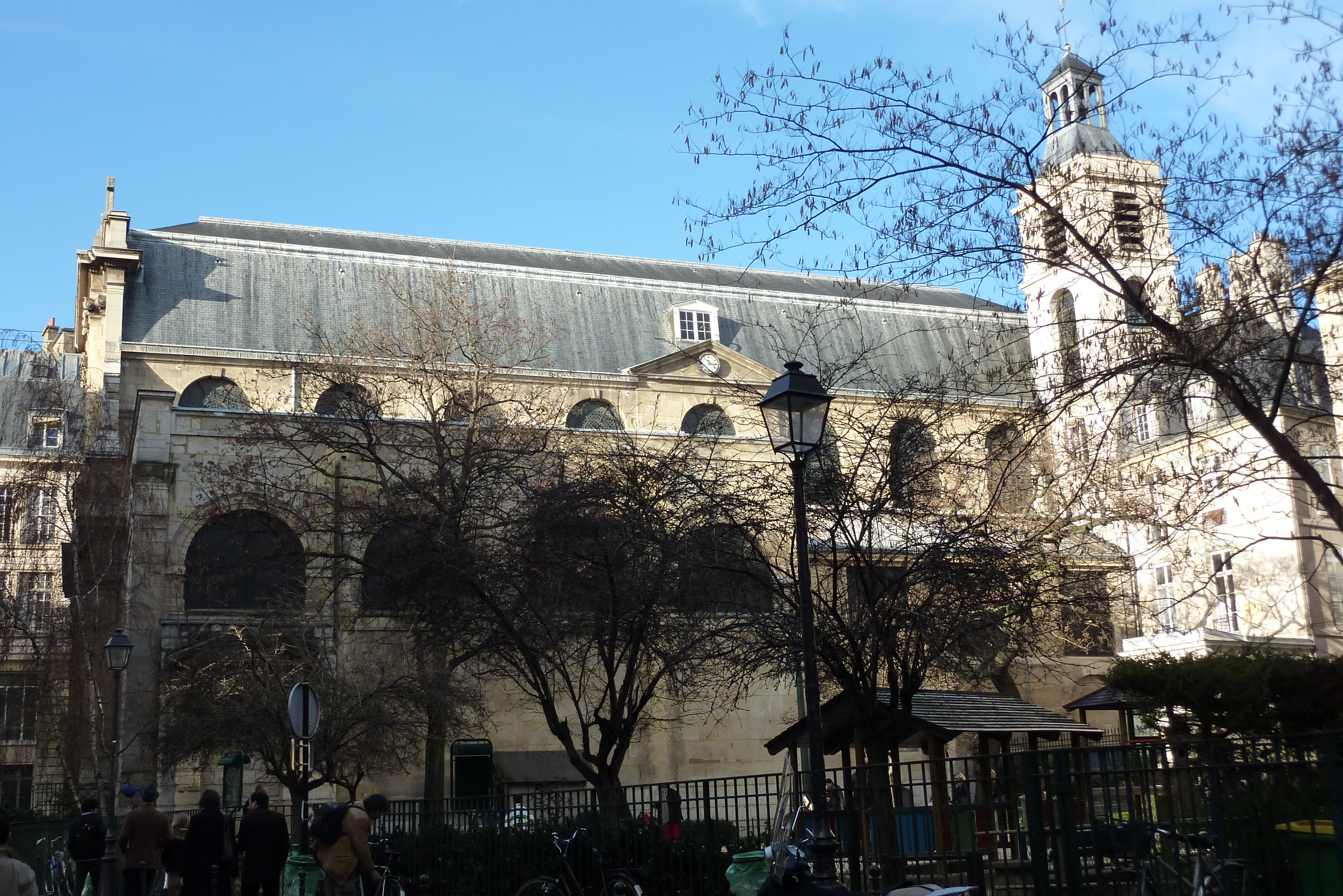
West side of church and bell tower

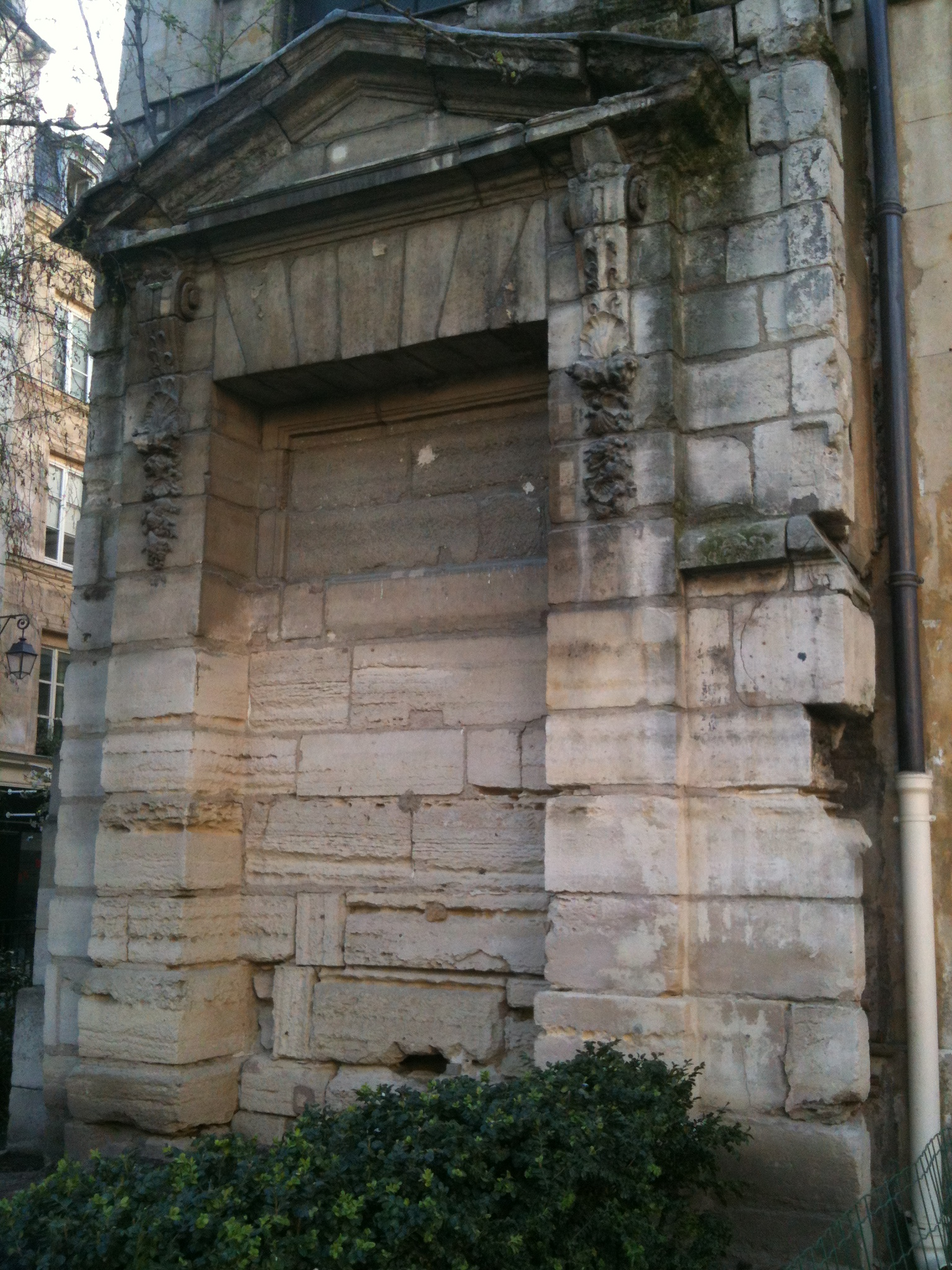
The abbey fountain from 1719, now on Square Charles-Victor-Langlois.

The church is oriented north-south, along the east side of the Square Charles-Victor-Langlois. The major entrance is at the south end, on rue des Blancs-Manteaux, with a secondary entrance on the north at 53 rue des Francs-Bourgeois.

The facade of the church was taken from another church, which was demolished during Haussmann's renovation of Paris. It followed the style of the Church of the Gesù in Rome, the model for Baroque churches across Europe. Built in 1704 on a plan Jean-Sylvain Cartault (1675-1758), the facade was transported stone by stone to the new site in 1863. The architect extended the nave by one traverse to make the junction with the new facade. The facade is composed of elements of two classical orders superimposed; The lower portion has pilasters with capitals of the Doric order, while the upper is decorated with pilasters and consoles of the Ionic order.

All the other buildings of the original Abbey were destroyed after the Revolution, but the fountain, built in 1719. was preserved. It was moved to its present location on the exterior of the church in 1979.

== Interior ==
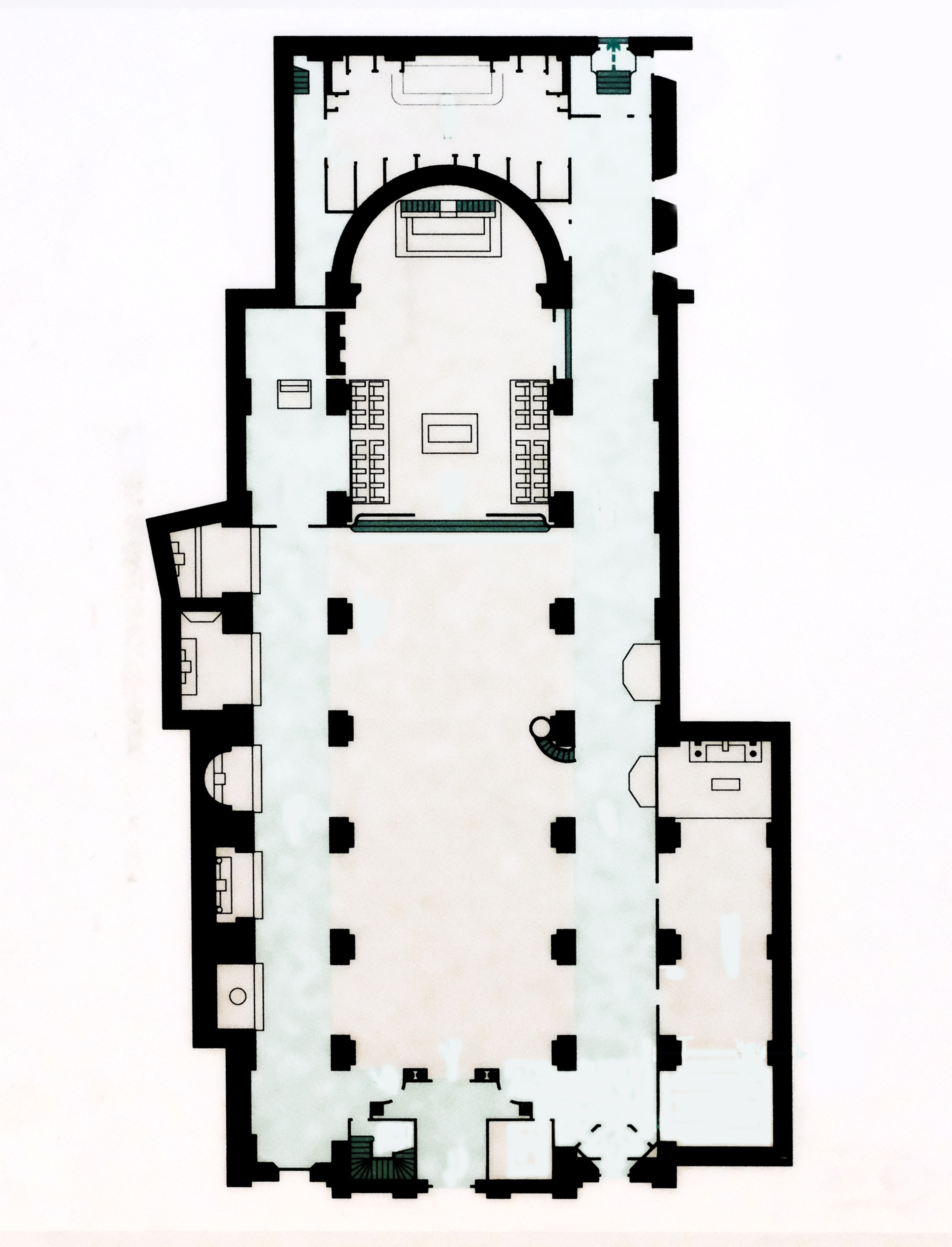
Plan of the church; Apse and choir to north, at top, and nave and portal below

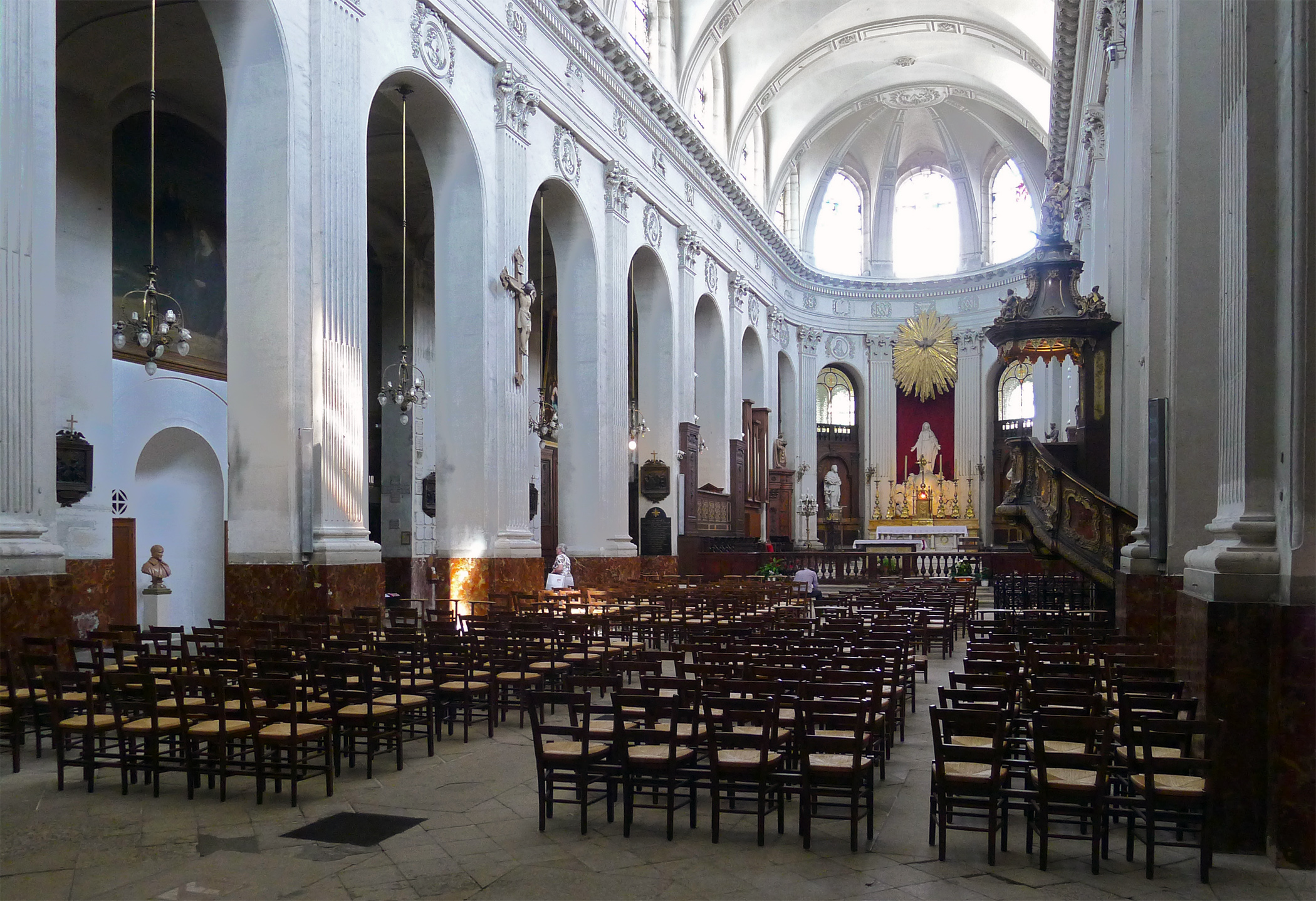
The nave, looking toward the altar

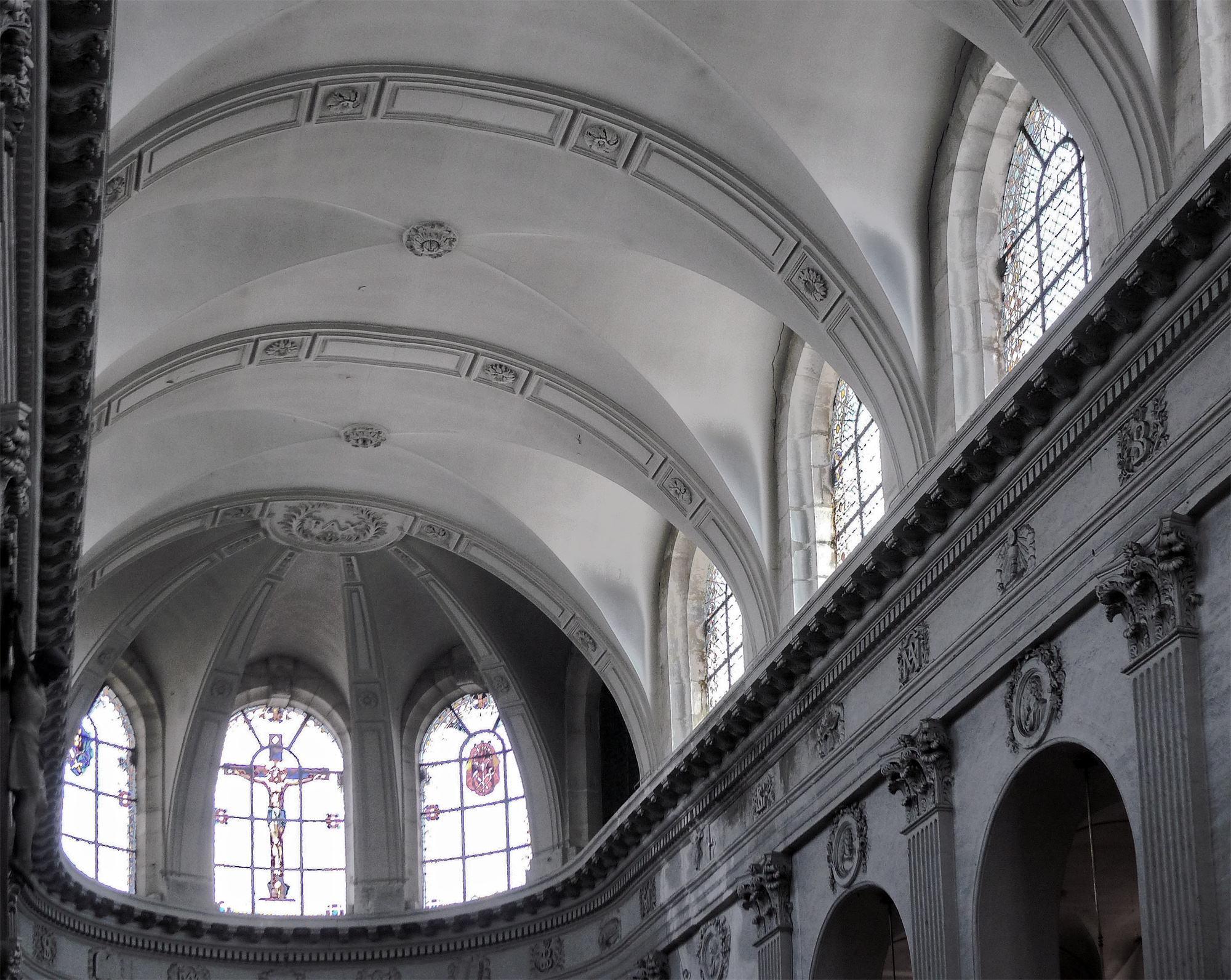
Arcades of the choir

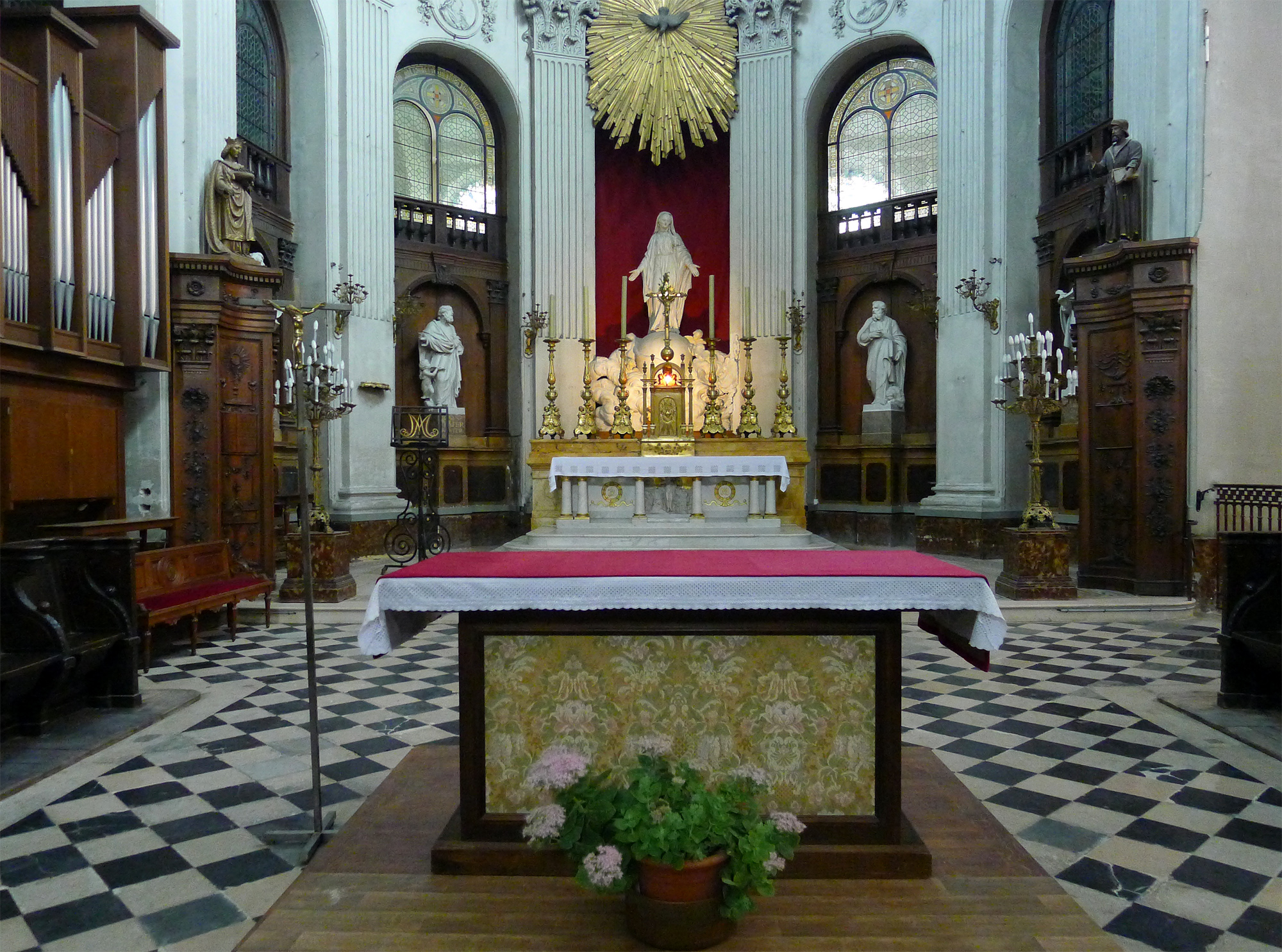
The Choir and altar

In keeping with the name, the interior of the church is almost entirely white. The nave is lined with classical columns with fluting, or shallow grooves, and topped with capitals in the Corinthian order. The columns support arcades with rounded arches. Following the medieval tradition, the entablements of the arcades decorated with symbolic bas-reliefs; those on the north represent events of the Old Testament, and those on the South from New Testament. Above these are medallions depicting prominent Saints.

== The Chapels ==
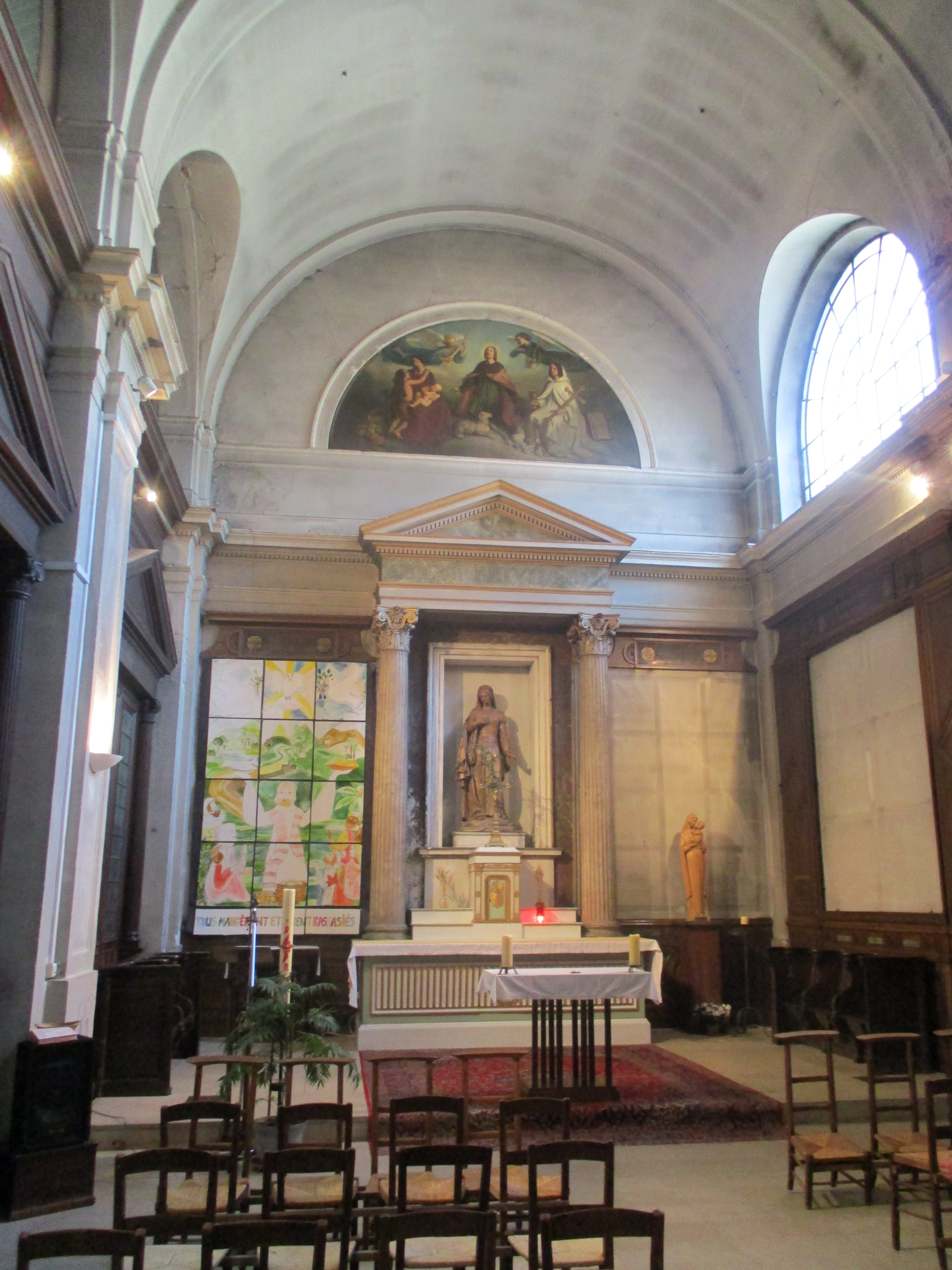
Chapel of the Virgin

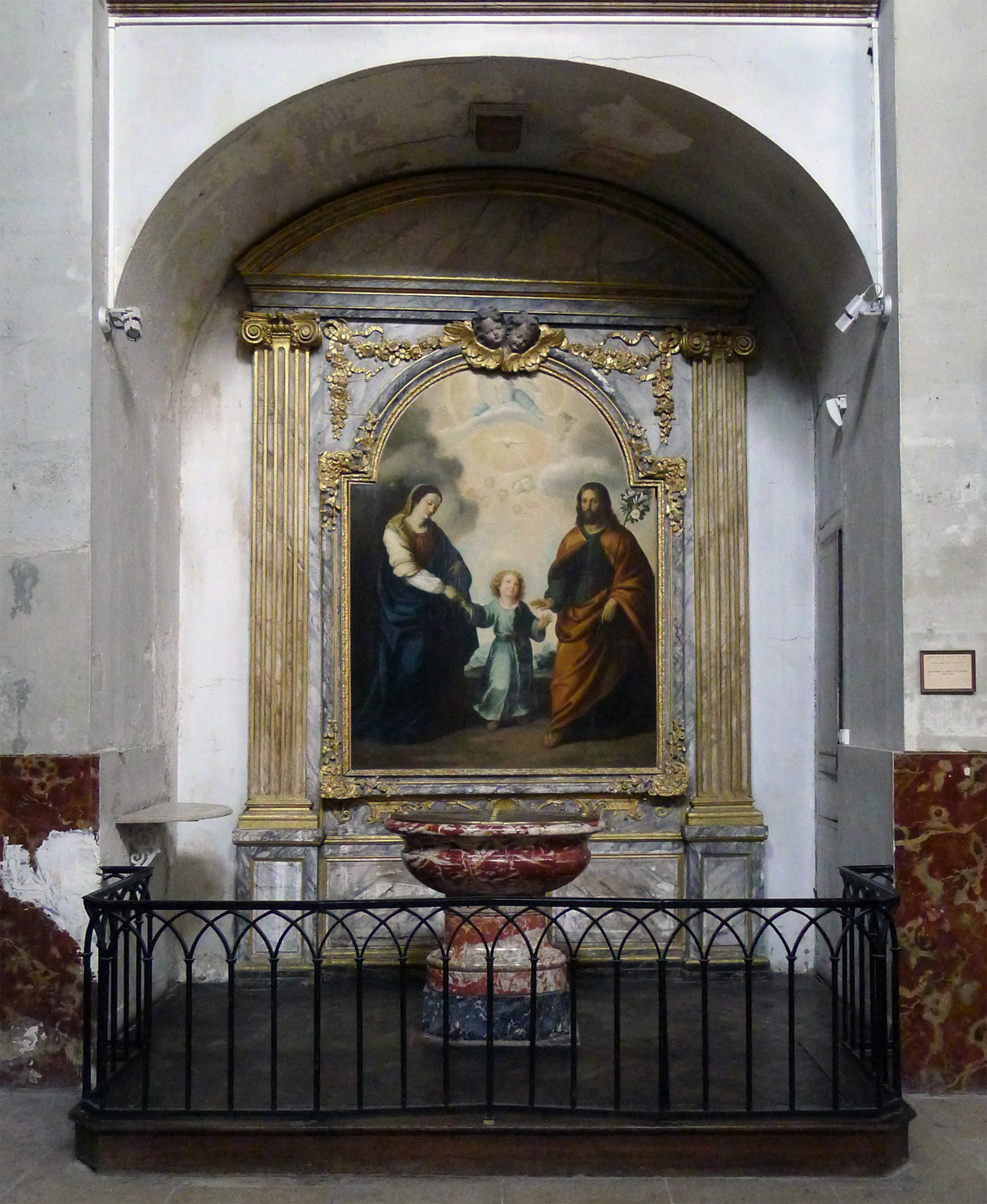
The Baptistry

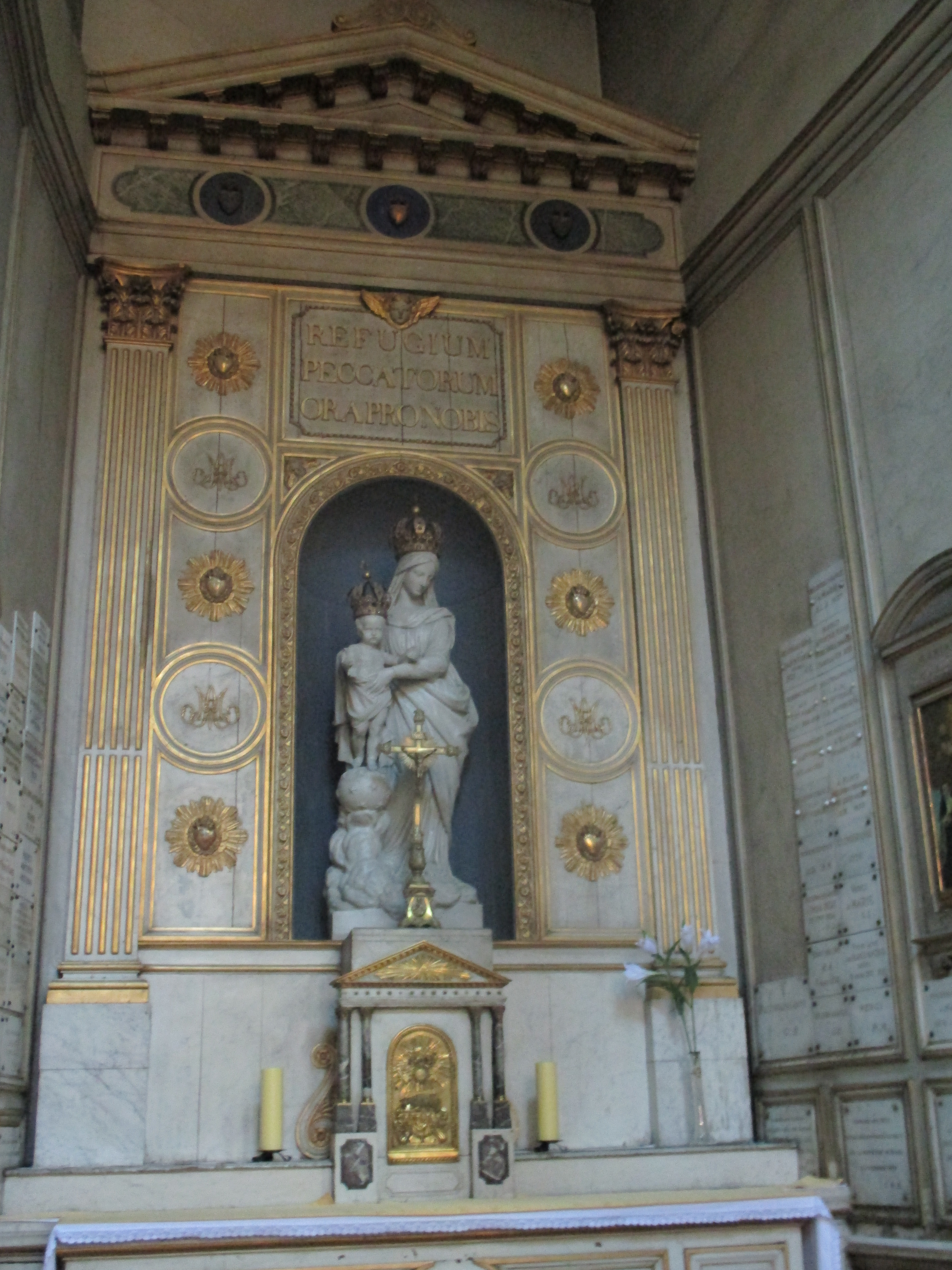
Chapel of Notre-Dame des Victoires, with crowned Virgin and child

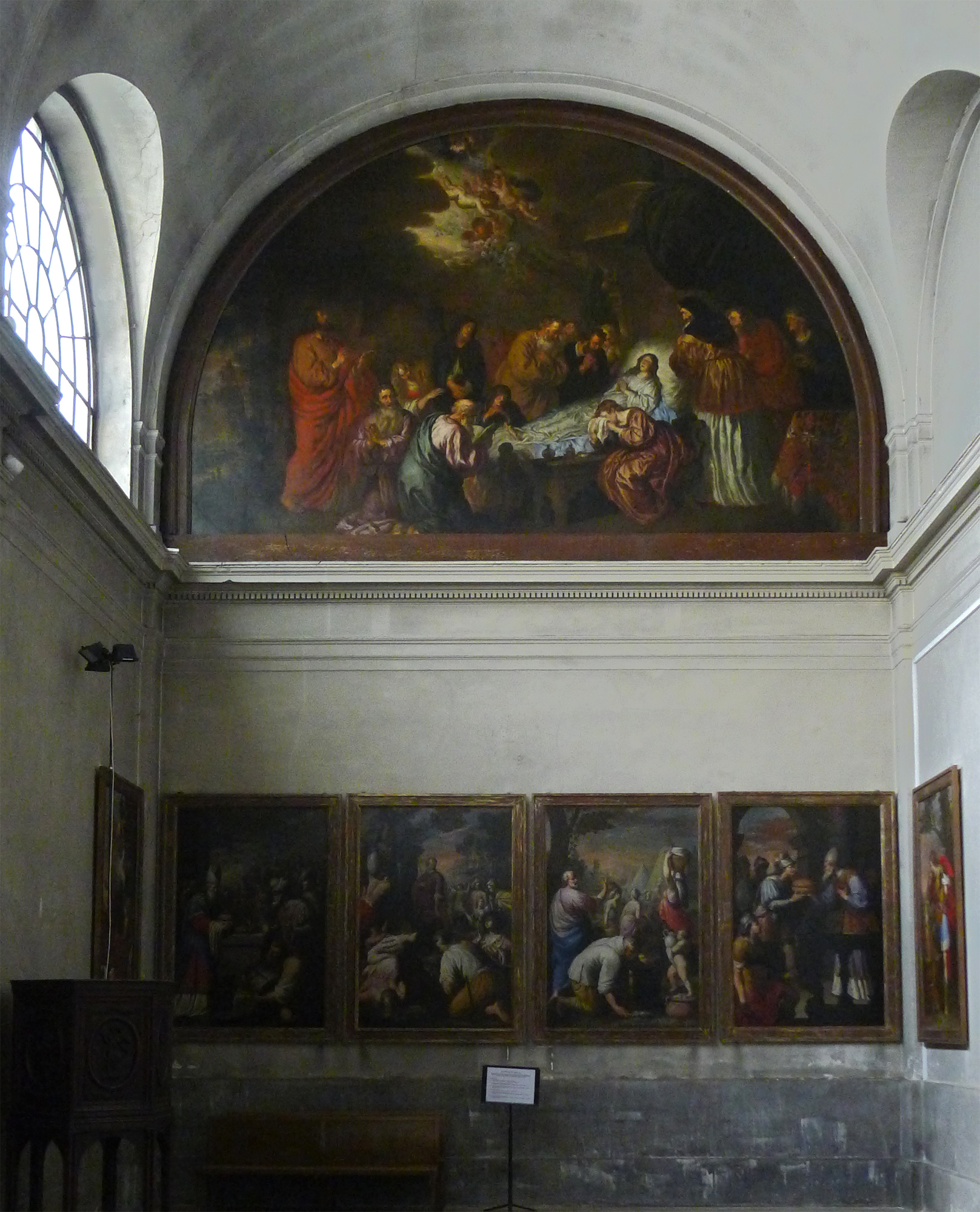
The Chapel of Saint Anne

== Art and Decoration ==
=== The Pulpit ===
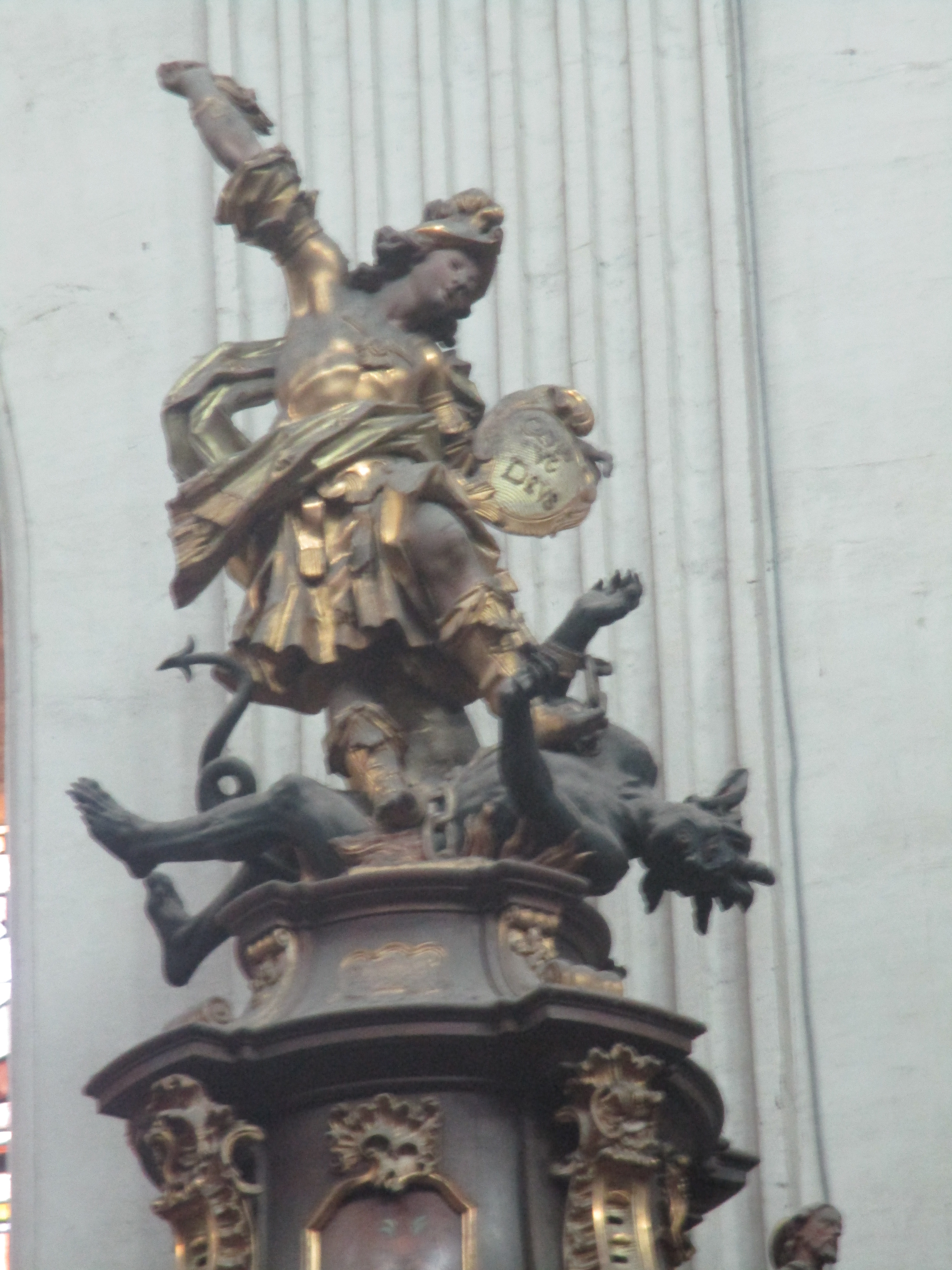
St. Michael overthrowing the Devil

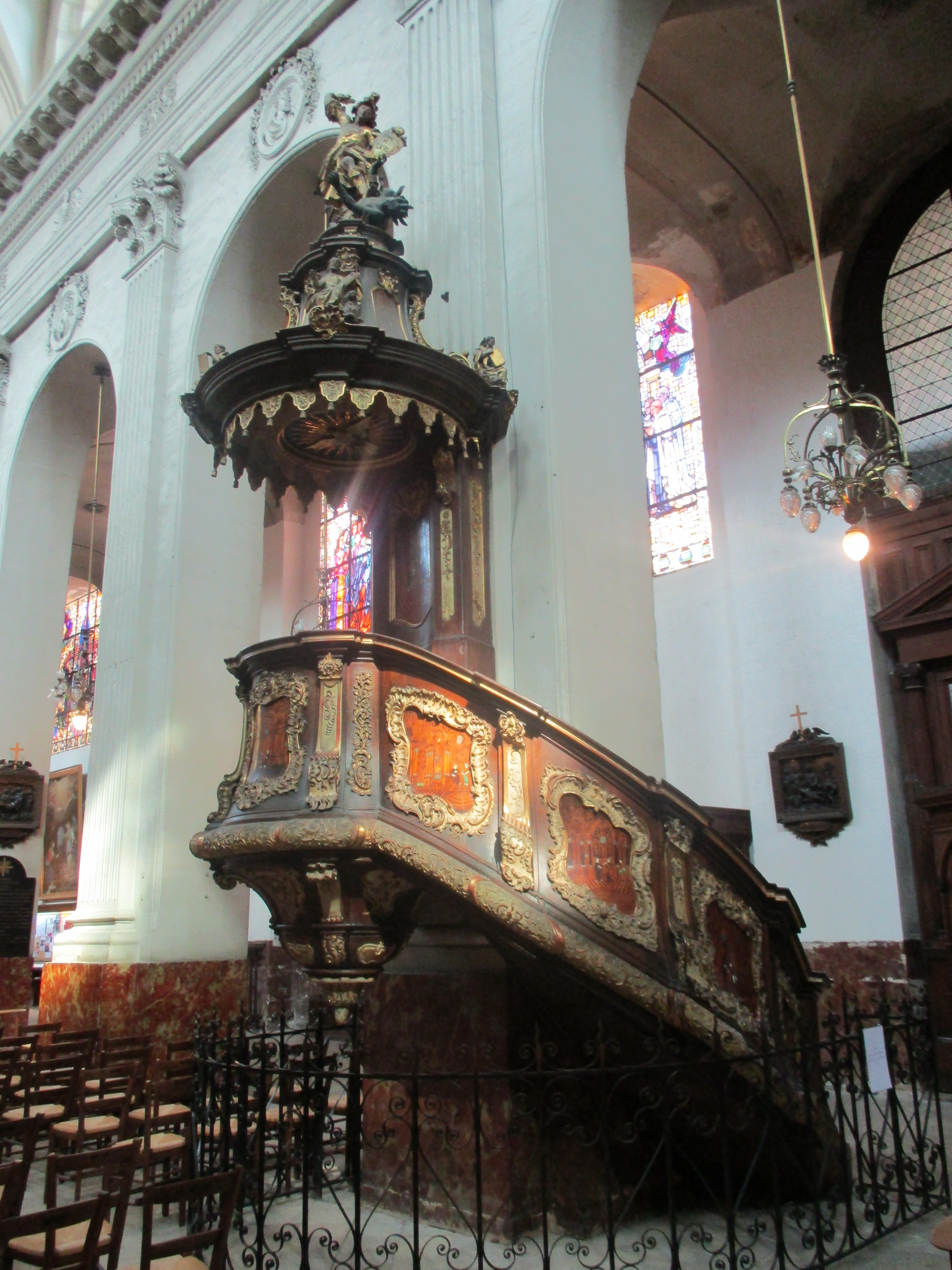
The pulpit (1749)

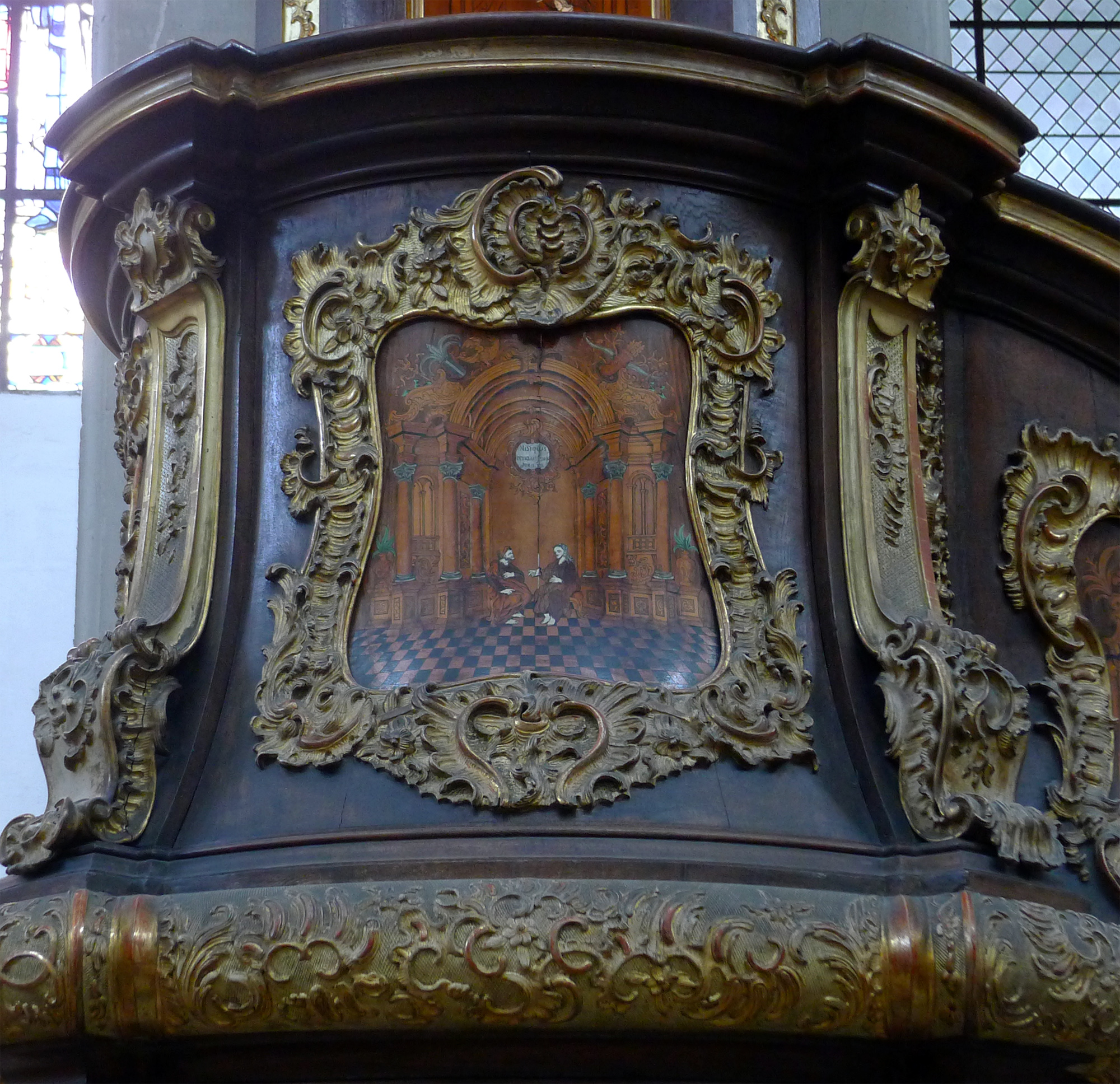
Detail of the marquetry

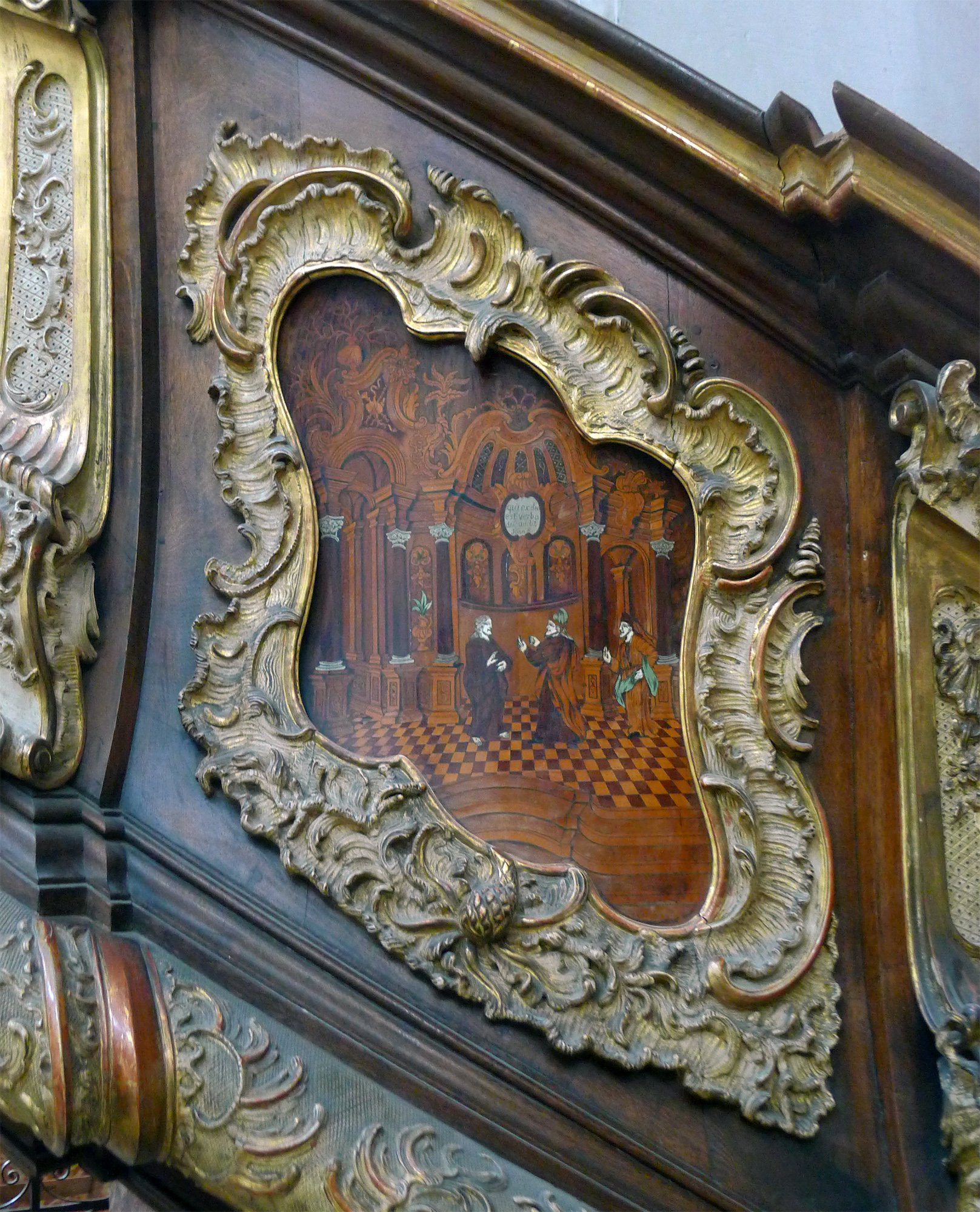
Marquetry of the stairs

The most striking feature of the nave is the pulpit, of sculpted wood, from which sermons and Biblical texts were read; it was designed so the speaker would be visible and audible to everyone in the church. The pulpit was made in Bavaria in 1749, the German rococo style. The stairway is decorated with medallions depicting scenes from the New Testament, made of marquetry encrusted with ivory and metals. On the summit of the pulpit is a sculpture of the Archangel Michael overthrowing the Devil.

=== Painting and Sculpture ===
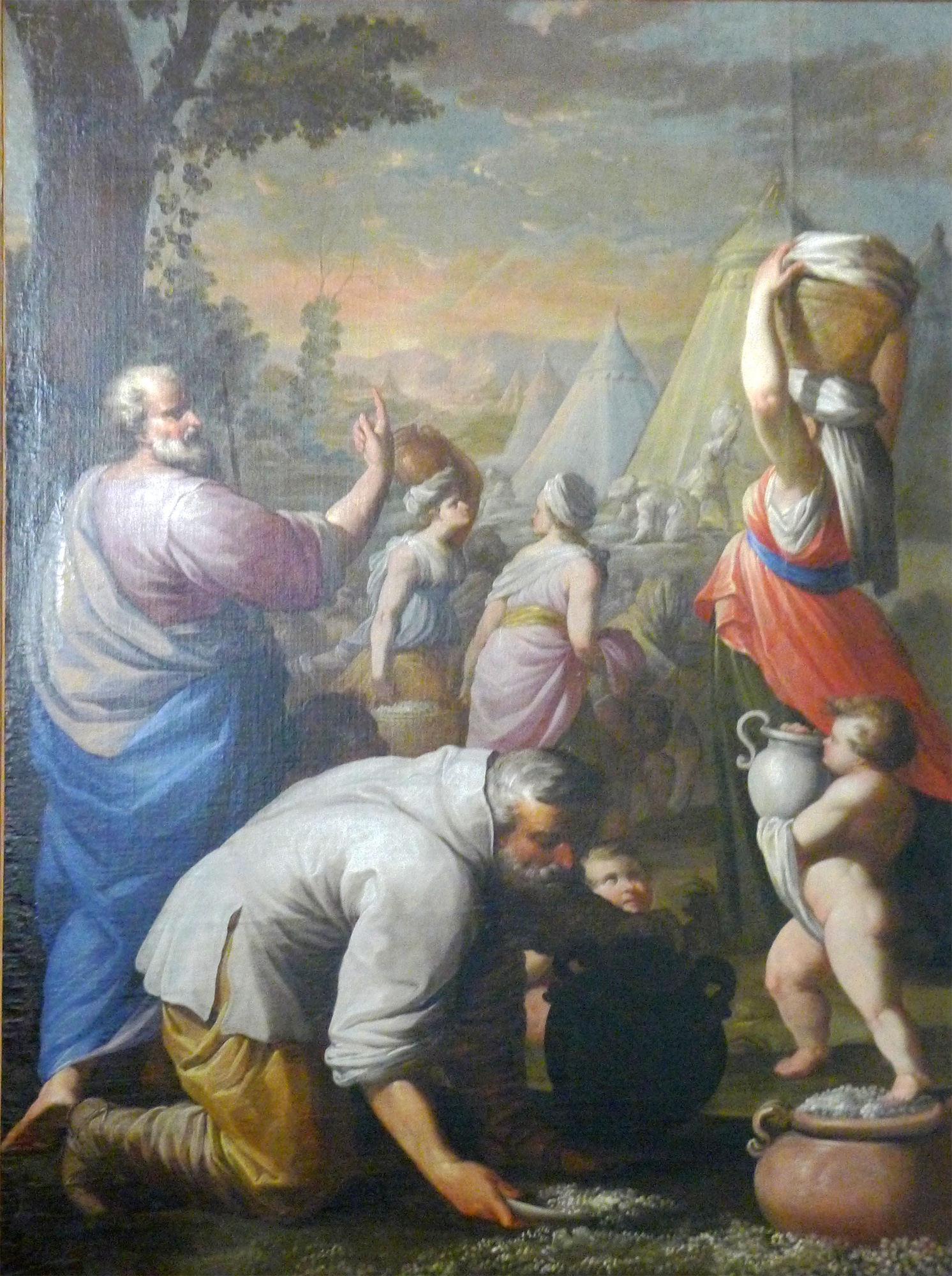
The Manna from Heaven (17th c.)

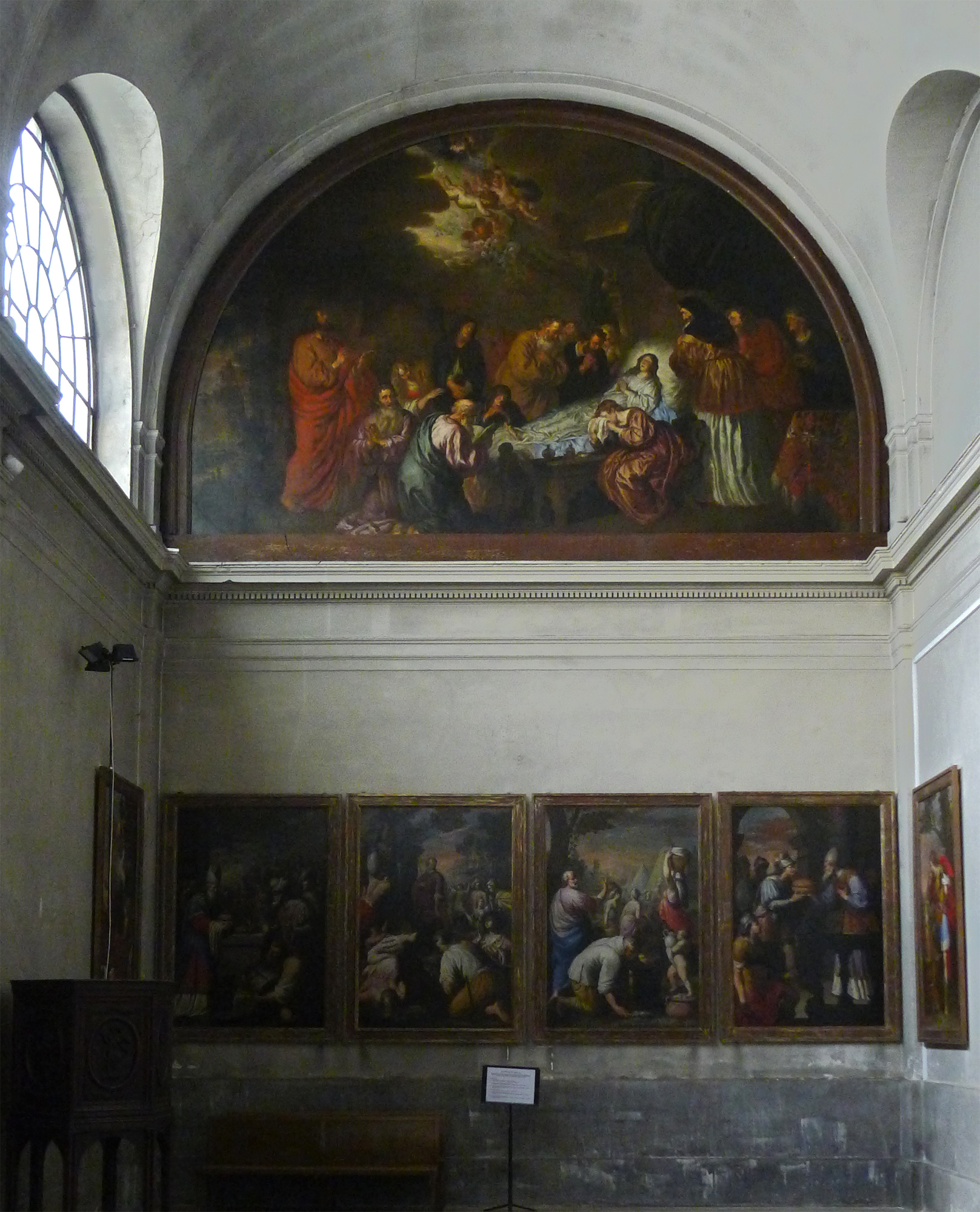
"The death of Saint Anne" by Joakim Sandrart (1640) (top)

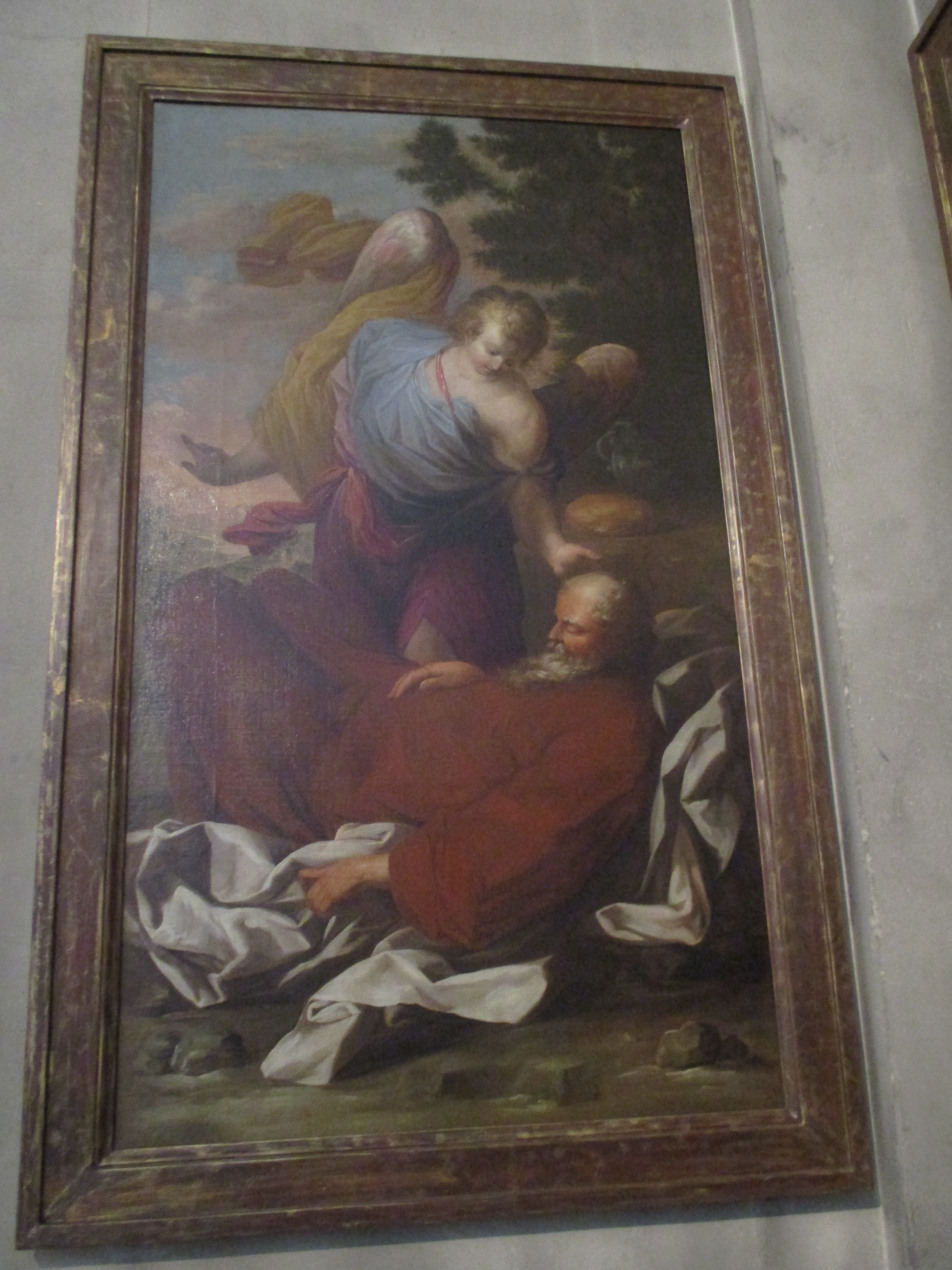
The Angel and the Prophet Elijah (17th c.)

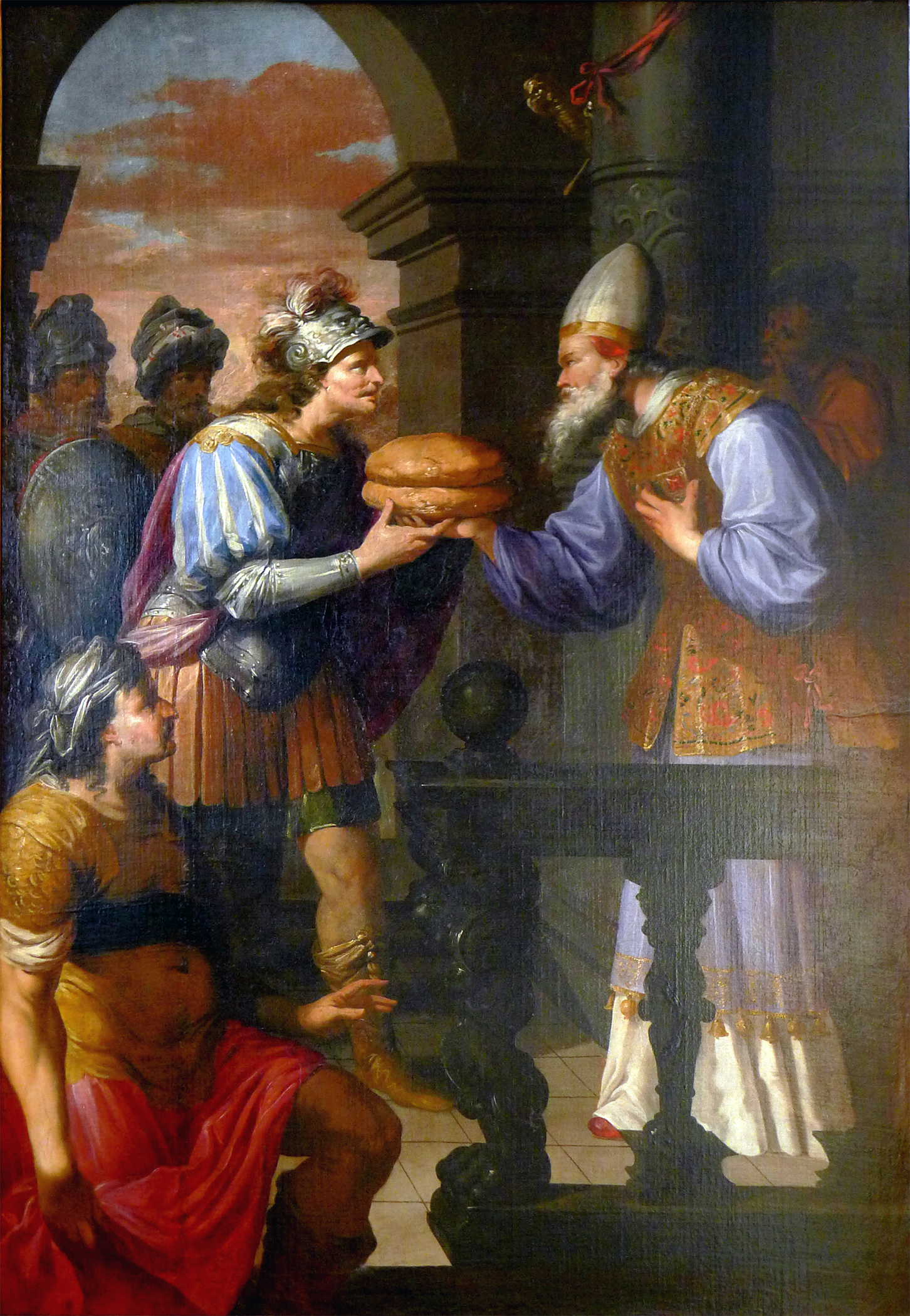
"David and the Priest Achimélech" (17th c.)

The church possesses a notable collection of sculpture and painting from the 17th century. The paintings of note include "The multiplication of the bread", by Claude Audran the Younger (1639–1684), depicting a miracle in the Bible by which Christ was able to feed a crowd of several thousand with seven loaves of bread and several fish (Mark 8, verses 1-9). Audran became an assistant to the royal painter Charles Le Brun, making frescos for the Tuileries Palace and for the Palace of Versailles.

=== Stained Glass ===
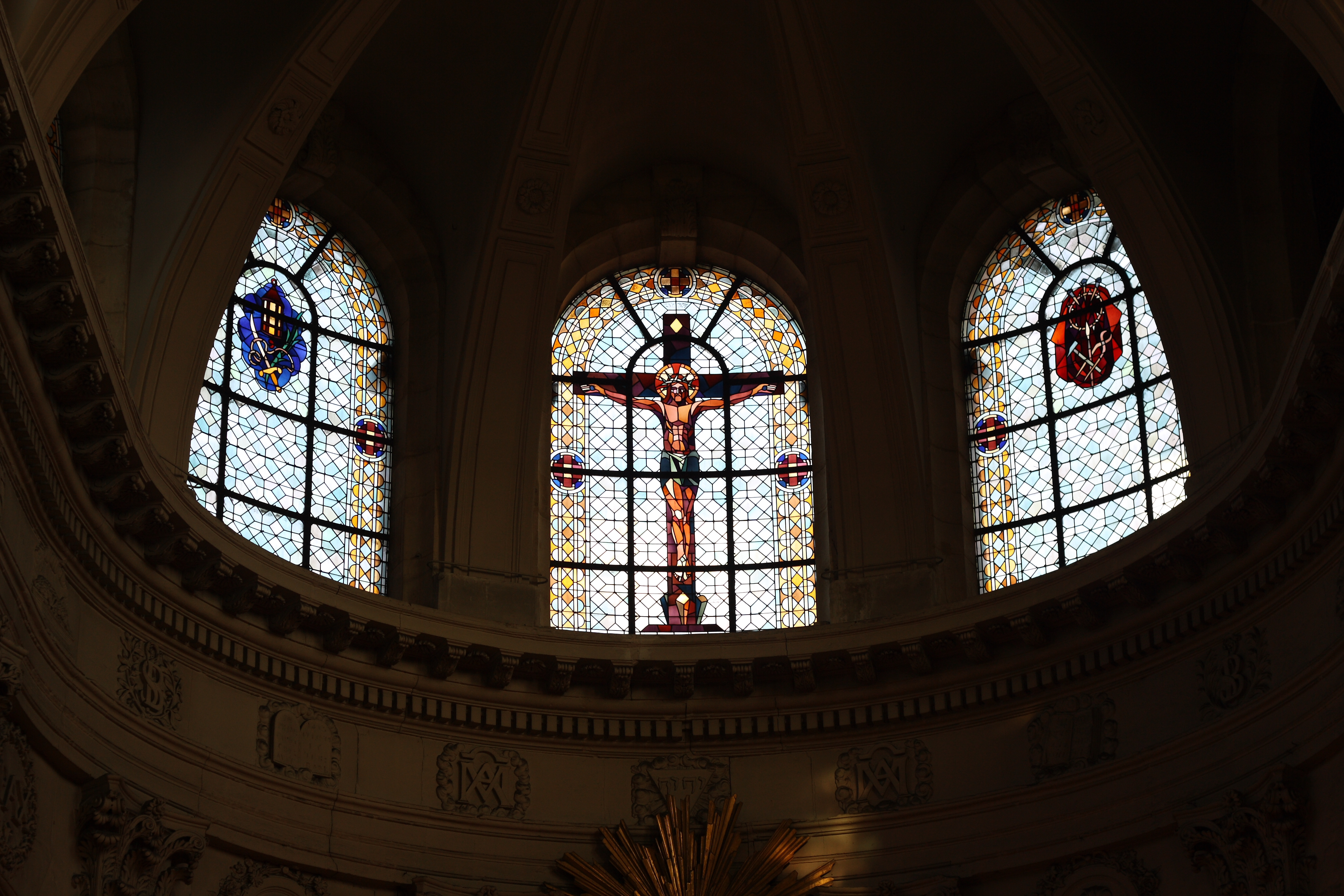
Upper windows of the choir

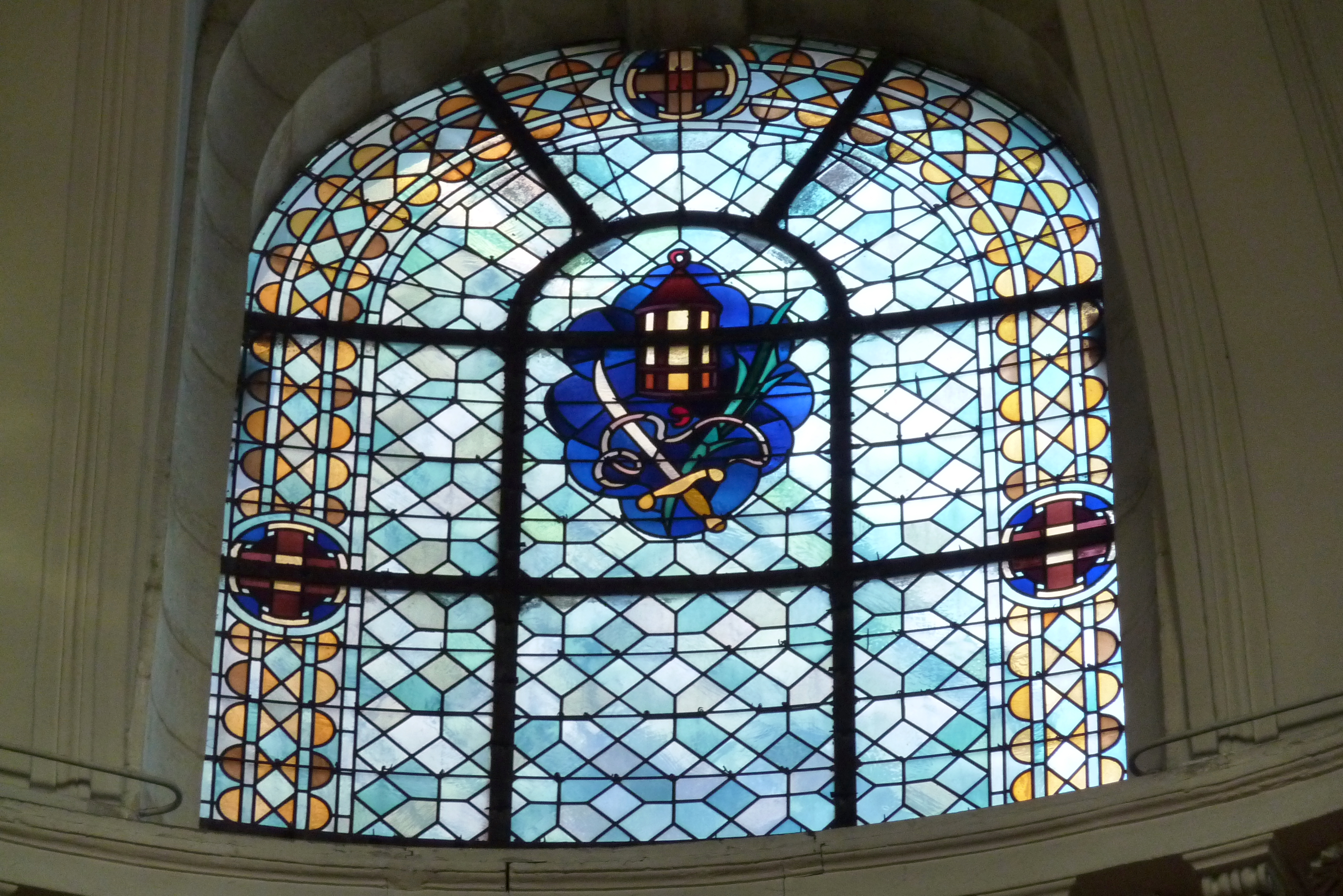
Lantern window ) (1940s)

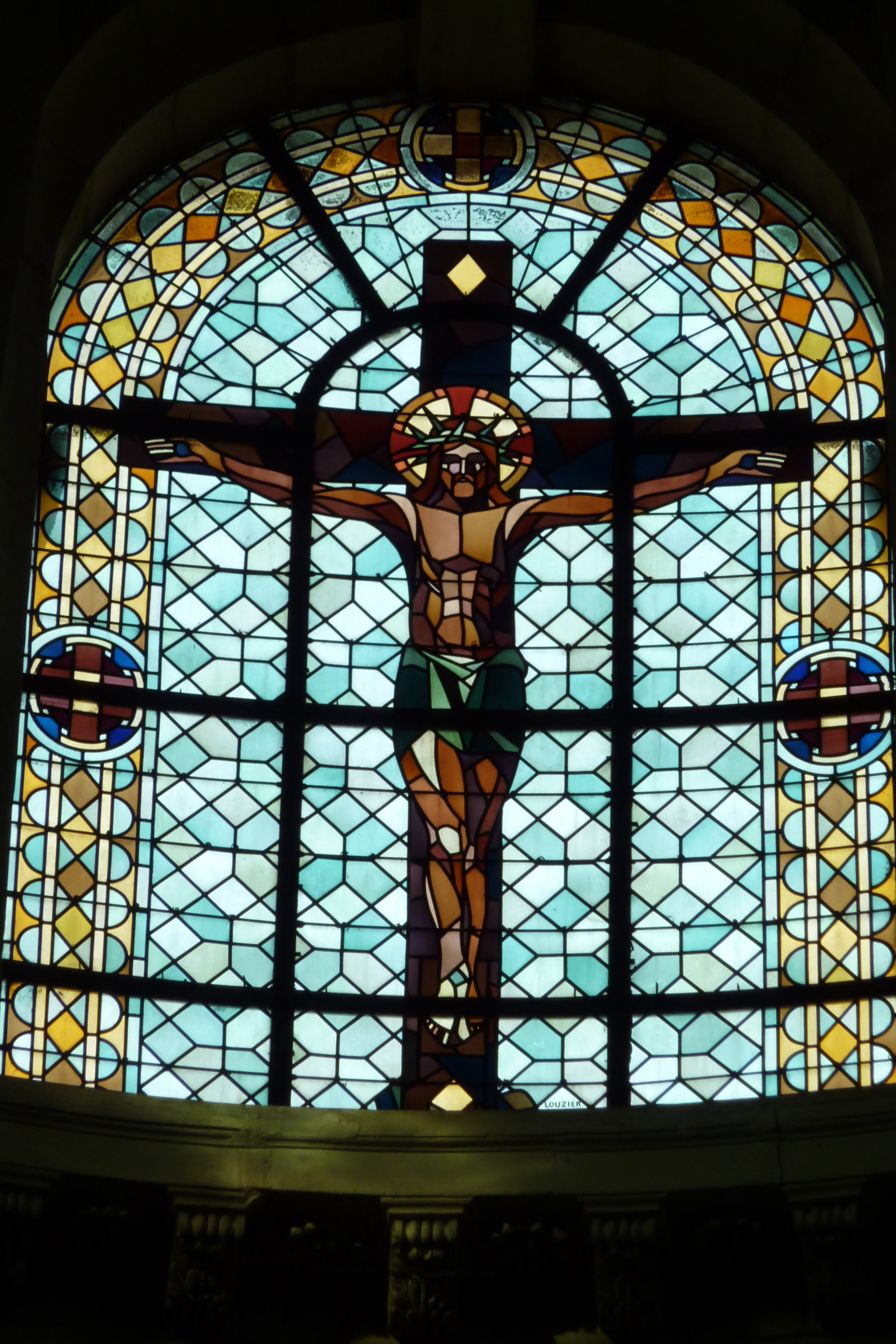

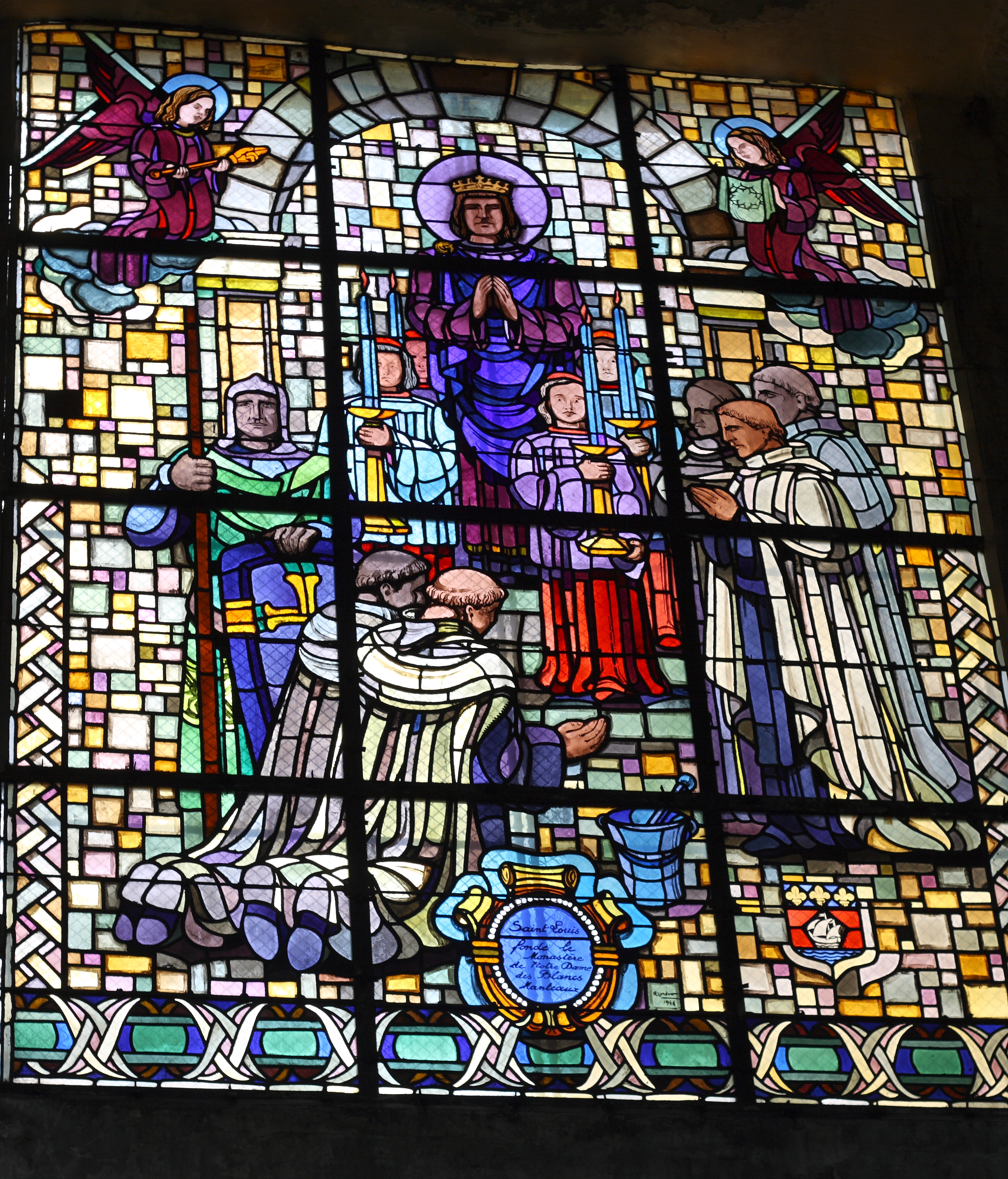
King Louis IX (Saint Louis) founds the monastery in 1685 (window made in 1946)

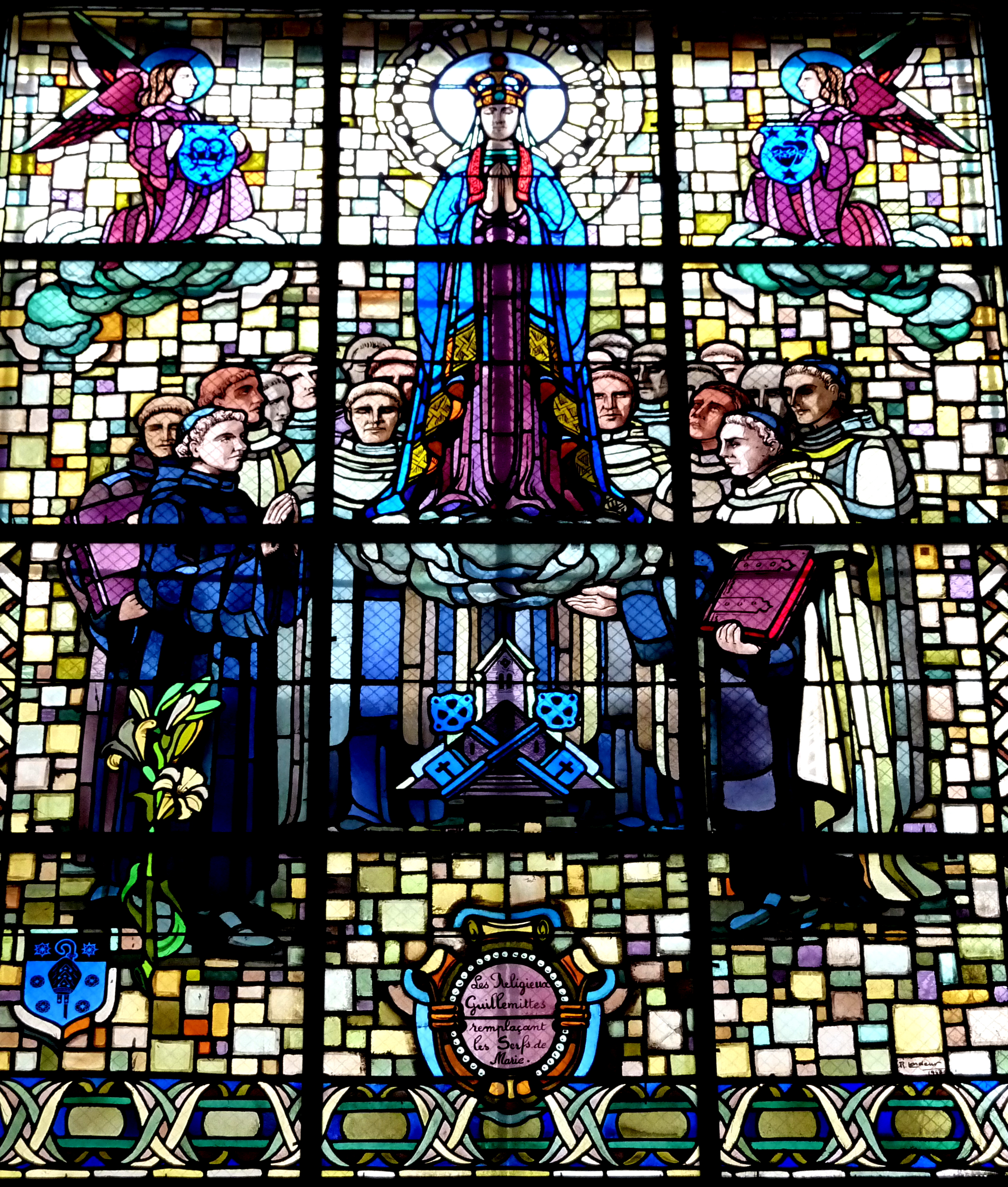
Depiction of the transfer of the abbey from the White Mantles to Guillaumites

The original stained glass disappeared with the first church during the Revolution. The present stained glass is from the mid-20th century.

== Organ and organ case ==
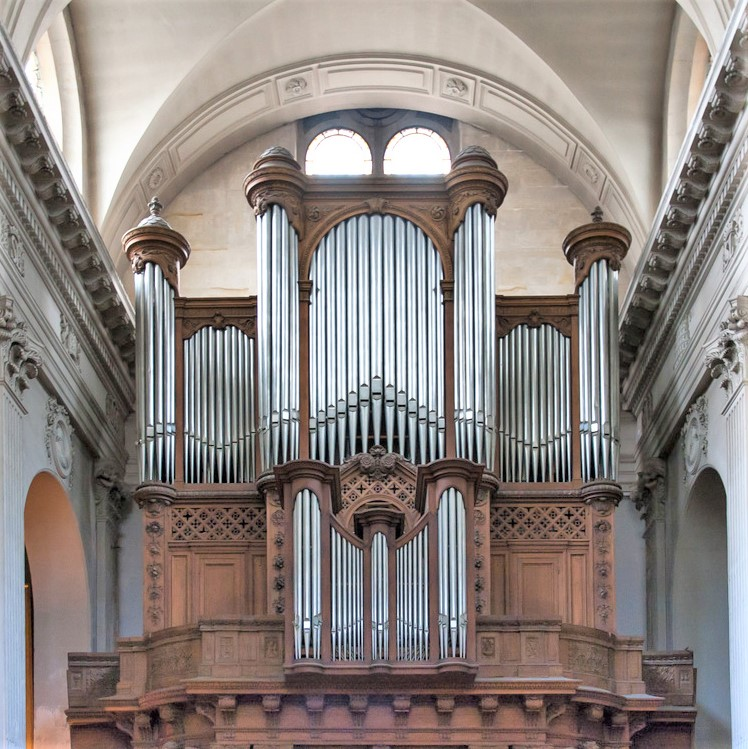
The grand organ

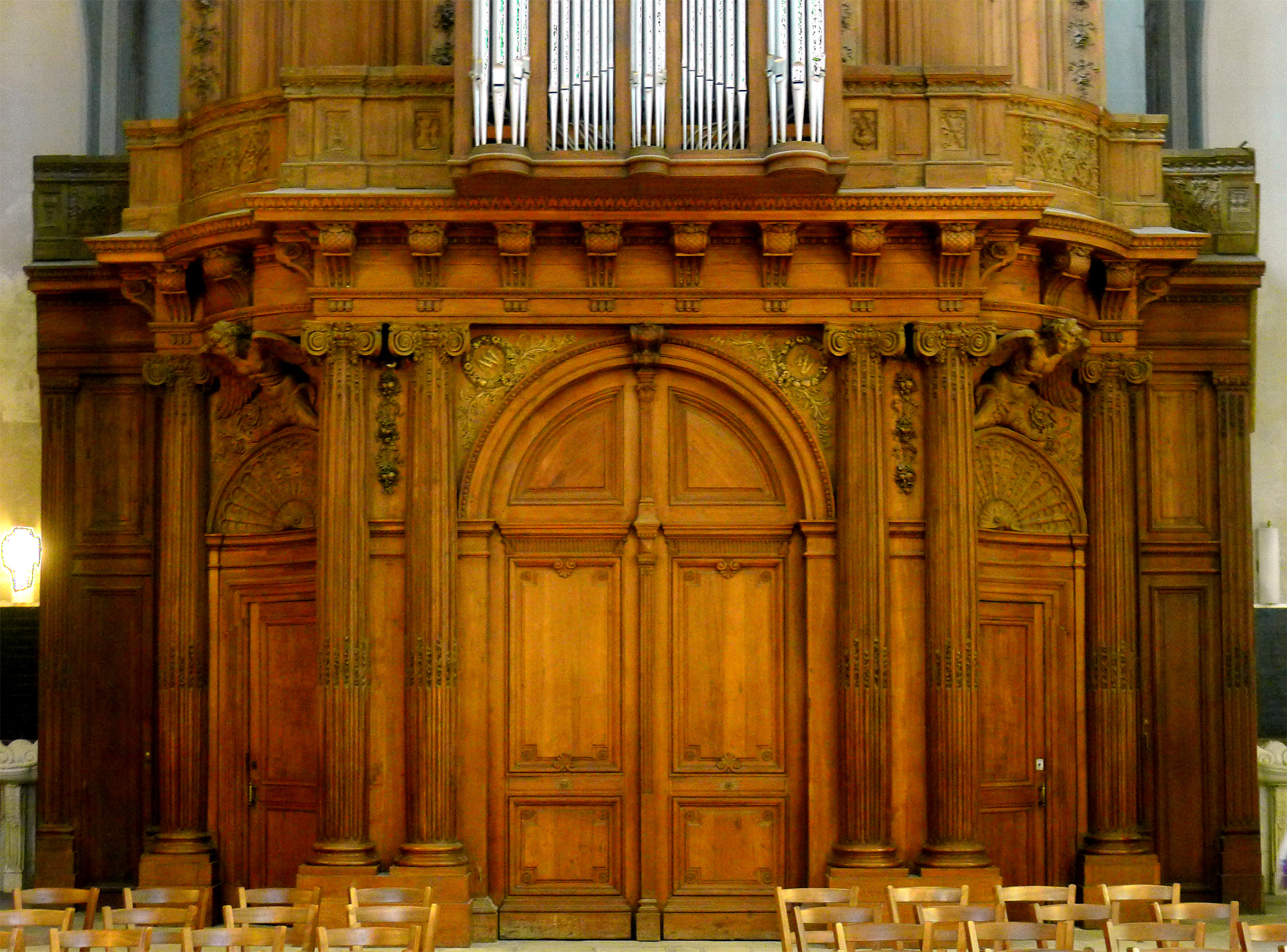
Portal below the case of the organ

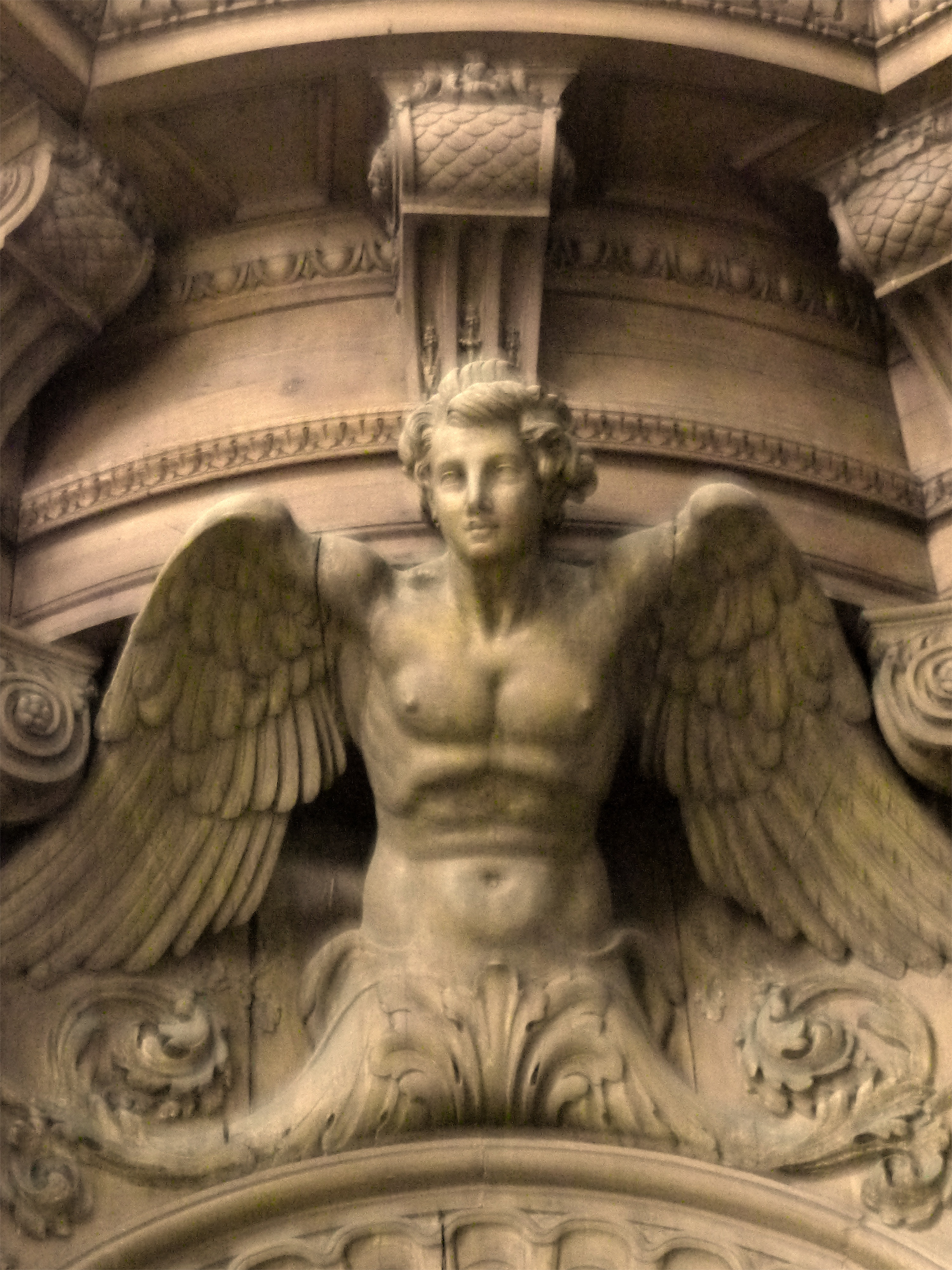
Detail of the organ case

The organ is a modern instrument made in the north German style by the firm of Kern, inaugurated in 1968. It features three keyboards and forty-two "Jeux" or organ stops. The church as an additional organ located in the choir.

The organ case is classified as an object of historic importance by the French Ministry of Culture. The organ case was designed by M. Baltard to be in harmony the porch interior, dating from the 17th century. The decoration of the organ case was carried out between 1831 and 1867. The tribune was created in 1863 by the architect Varcollier, re-using finely carved woodwork coming from the Abbey of Saint Victor, which was demolished in 1795 during the French Revolution. The works of the entrance include a gallery of six carved columns with Ionic order capitals. The portal itself is framed in finely carved wooden sculpture.

== Bibliography (in French) ==
- Dumoulin, Aline; Ardisson, Alexandra; Maingard, Jérôme; Antonello, Murielle; Églises de Paris (2017), Éditions Massin, Issy-Les-Moulineaux, ISBN 978-2-7072-0683-1 (in French)
