= Thomas de Cormont =

French architect, master-mason

Thomas de Cormont (born towards the end of the twelfth century) was a French Gothic Era master-mason and architect who worked on the Cathedral of Notre-Dame in Amiens following the death of its chief architect, Robert de Luzarches. There is speculation that Thomas may have been Robert's disciple.

In addition to Amiens Cathedral, he is also believed to have worked contributed to both the Saint-Germain-en-Laye and the Sainte-Chapelle.

His son, Renaud de Cormont, continued his work Amiens Cathedral in the 1240s.
