= Robert of Luzarches =

French architect

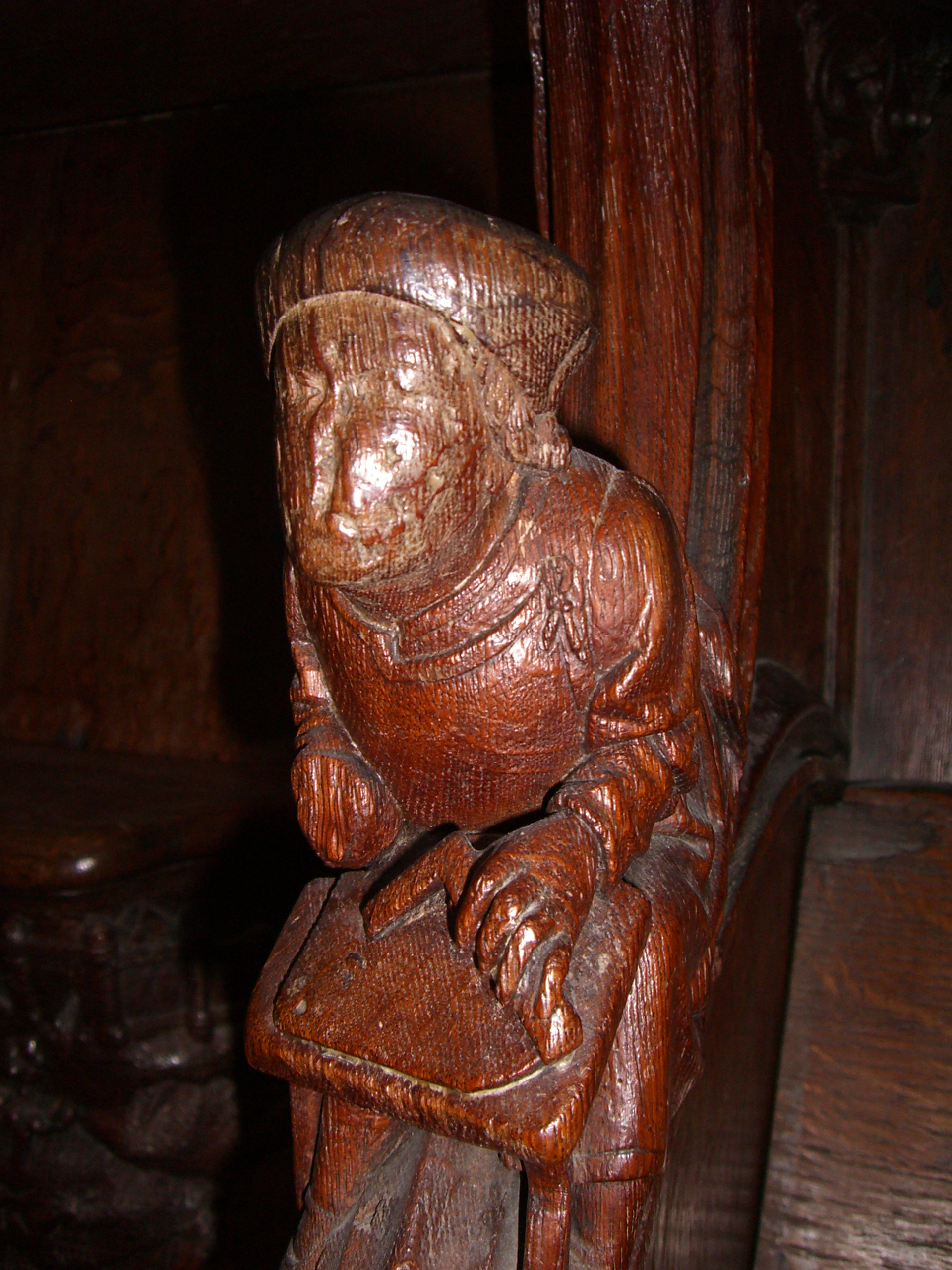
Robert de Luzarches sculpted in an armrest of the stalls of the Amiens Cathedral.

Robert of Luzarches (born in Luzarches near Pontoise towards the end of the twelfth century) was a 13th-century French architect who worked on the cathedral of Notre Dame in Amiens.

He is said to have been summoned to Paris by King Philip II who employed him in beautifying the city, and to have had a share in the work on Notre Dame de Paris. The old Amiens cathedral was destroyed by fire in 1218 and Bishop Evrard de Fouilloy had it rebuilt in Gothic style. An inscription made in 1288 in the "labyrinth" of the floor (later removed) testified that the building had begun in 1220, and names "Robert, called of Luzarches", as the architect, and as his successors, Thomas de Cormont and the latter's son. The work was completed in later centuries. Viollet-le-Duc sees a fact of great significance in the employment of the layman, Robert; but it is not accurate that in Romanesque times the architects were always bishops, priests, or monks. Robert was not long employed on the cathedral.

Under the successor of Bishop Evrard, who apparently died in 1222, Cormont appears as the architect. Before 1240 Bishop Bernard put a choir window in the provisionally completed cathedral. An intended alteration of the original plan was not used in the finished building. In his day it was called the "Gothic Parthenon". It is more spacious than Notre Dame in Paris and considerably larger than the cathedral of Reims. But Robert's creation became a standard, through France and beyond, on account of the successful manner in which weight and strength are counterbalanced and of the consistently Gothic style. The design presents a middle aisle and two side aisles, though the choir has five aisles and the transept has the width of seven aisles. The choir is flanked by seven chapels; that in the centre (the Lady chapel) projecting beyond the others in French style. The nave is about 470 ft. in length, 164 ft. in breadth (213 ft. in the transept), and 141 ft. in height.
